Havana (Spanish: La Habana ) is the capital and largest city of Cuba. The heart of the La Habana Province, Havana is the country's main port and commercial center. The city has a population of 2.3million inhabitants, and it spans a total of  – making it the largest city by area, the most populous city, and the fourth largest metropolitan area in the Caribbean region.

The city of Havana was founded by the Spanish in the 16th century. It served as a springboard for the Spanish conquest of the Americas, becoming a stopping point for Spanish galleons returning to Spain. Philip II of Spain granted Havana the title of capital in 1607. Walls as well as forts were built to protect the city.

The city is the center of the Cuban government, and home to various ministries, headquarters of businesses and over 100 diplomatic offices. The governor is Reinaldo García Zapata of the Communist Party of Cuba (PCC). In 2009, the city/province had the third highest income in the country.

Contemporary Havana can essentially be described as three cities in one: Old Havana, Vedado and the newer suburban districts. The city extends mostly westward and southward from the bay, which is entered through a narrow inlet and which divides into three main harbors: Marimelena, Guanabacoa and Antares. The Almendares River traverses the city from south to north, entering the Straits of Florida a few miles west of the bay.

The city attracts over amillion tourists annually; the Official Census for Havana reports that in 2010 the city was visited by 1,176,627 international tourists, a 20% increase from 2005. Old Havana was declared a UNESCO World Heritage Site in 1982. The city is also noted for its history, culture, architecture and monuments. As typical of Cuba, Havana experiences a tropical climate.

Etymology 
In 1514, Diego Velázquez founded the city San Cristóbal de la Habana, which meant "Saint Christopher of the Habana" and later became the capital of Cuba. Habana was the name of the local people group. It is not clear where the name derived from, but it has been theorized that the appellation derives from Habaguanex, who was a chief of the Native American tribe. His name is Taíno, which is an Arawakan language, but nothing else is known. Usage of the word Havana in literature understandably peaked during the Spanish–American War, but it still is being propped up a lot because it represents a type of cigar, a color, and a type of rabbit as well as the city.

 Havana is still the prevailing name found in English language dictionaries in reference to the capital of Cuba.

Coat of arms 

The coat of arms of Havana consists of three castles that represent the three castles that defended the city: the Fuerza Castle, the Morro Castle and the Punta Castle. The key represents that Havana was the gateway to the New World. The shield, supported by an oak branch on one side and a laurel wreath on the other, symbolizes the strength of the nation, the laurel wreath, honor, and glory. These symbols represent the rights of man.

History

16th century 

Diego Velázquez de Cuéllar founded Havana in 1514, on the southern coast of the island, near the present town of Surgidero de Batabanó on the banks of the Mayabeque River close to Playa Mayabeque. However, all attempts to found a city on Cuba's south coast failed; an early map of Cuba drawn in 1514 places the town at the mouth of the river.

Between 1514 and 1519 the Spanish established two settlements on the north coast, one of them in La Chorrera, around the site of the Torreón de la Chorrera, what eventually became the neighborhoods of Vedado and Miramar, next to the mouth of the Almendares River. The town that became Havana originated adjacent to what was then called Puerto de Carenas (literally, "Careening Bay"), in 1519. The quality of this natural bay, which now hosts Havana's harbor, warranted this change of location.

Pánfilo de Narváez gave Havana – the sixth town founded by the Spanish on Cuba – its name: San Cristóbal de la Habana. The name combines San Cristóbal, patron saint of Havana. Shortly after the founding of Cuba's first cities, the island served as little more than a base for the Conquista of other lands.

Havana began as a trading port, and suffered regular attacks by buccaneers, pirates, and French corsairs. The first attack and resultant burning of the city was by the French corsair Jacques de Sores in 1555. Such attacks convinced the Spanish Crown to fund the construction of the first fortresses in the main cities – not only to counteract the pirates and corsairs, but also to exert more control over commerce with the West Indies, and to limit the extensive contrabando (black market) that had arisen due to the trade restrictions imposed by the Casa de Contratación of Seville (the crown-controlled trading house that held a monopoly on New World trade).

Ships from all over the New World carried products first to Havana, to be taken by the fleet to Spain. The thousands of ships gathered in the city's bay also fueled Havana's agriculture and manufacture, since they had to be supplied with food, water, and other products needed to traverse the ocean.

On December 20, 1592, King Philip II of Spain granted Havana the title of City. Later on, the city would be officially designated as "Key to the New World and Rampart of the West Indies" by the Spanish Crown. In the meantime, efforts to build or improve the defensive infrastructures of the city continued.

17th century 

Havana expanded greatly in the 17th century. New buildings were constructed from the most abundant materials of the island, mainly wood, combining various Iberian architectural styles, as well as borrowing profusely from Canarian characteristics. During this period the city also built civic monuments and religious constructions. The convent of St Augustin, El Morro Castle, the chapel of the Humilladero, the fountain of Dorotea de la Luna in La Chorrera, the church of the Holy Angel, the hospital de San Lazaro, the monastery of Santa Teresa and the convent of San Felipe Neri were completed in this era.

In 1649 a fatal epidemic, brought from Cartagena in Colombia, affected a third of the population of Havana. On November 30, 1665, Queen Mariana of Austria, widow of King Philip IV of Spain, ratified the heraldic shield of Cuba, which took as its symbolic motifs the first three castles of Havana: the Real Fuerza, the Tres Santos Reyes Magos del Morro and San Salvador de la Punta. The shield also displayed a symbolic golden key to represent the title "Key to the Gulf". In 1674, the works for the City Walls were started, as part of the fortification efforts. They would be completed by 1740.

By the middle of the 18th century Havana had more than seventy thousand inhabitants, and was the third-largest city in the Americas, ranking behind Lima and Mexico City but ahead of Boston and New York City.

18th century 

During the 18th century Havana was the most important of the Spanish ports because it had facilities where ships could be refitted and, by 1740, it had become Spain's largest and most active shipyard and only drydock in the New World.

The city was captured by the British during the Seven Years' War. The episode began on June 6, 1762, when at dawn, a British fleet, comprising more than 50 ships and a combined force of over 11,000 men of the Royal Navy and Army, sailed into Cuban waters and made an amphibious landing east of Havana. The British immediately opened up trade with their North American and Caribbean colonies, causing a rapid transformation of Cuban society. Less than a year after Havana was seized, the Peace of Paris was signed by the three warring powers thus ending the Seven Years' War. The treaty gave Britain Florida in exchange for the return of the city of Havana on to Spain.

After regaining the city, the Spanish transformed Havana into the most heavily fortified city in the Americas. Construction began on what was to become the Fortress of San Carlos de la Cabaña, the third biggest Spanish fortification in the New World after Castillo San Cristóbal (the biggest) and Castillo San Felipe del Morro both in San Juan, Puerto Rico. On January 15, 1796, the remains of Christopher Columbus were transported to the island from Santo Domingo. They rested here until 1898, when they were transferred to Seville's Cathedral, after Spain's loss of Cuba.

19th century 

As trade between Caribbean and North American states increased in the early 19th century, Havana became a flourishing and fashionable city. Havana's theaters featured the most distinguished actors of the age, and prosperity among the burgeoning middle-class led to expensive new classical mansions being erected. During this period Havana became known as the Paris of the Antilles.

In 1837, the first railroad was constructed, a  stretch between Havana and Bejucal, which was used for transporting sugar from the valley of Güines to the harbor. With this, Cuba became the fifth country in the world to have a railroad, and the first Spanish-speaking country. Throughout the century, Havana was enriched by the construction of additional cultural facilities, such as the Tacón Theatre, one of the most luxurious in the world. The fact that slavery was legal in Cuba until 1886 led to Southern American interest, including a plan by the Knights of the Golden Circle to create a 'Golden Circle' with a 1200mile-radius centered on Havana. After the Confederate States of America were defeated in the American Civil War in 1865, many former slaveholders continued to run plantations by moving to Havana.

In 1863, the city walls were knocked down so that the metropolis could be enlarged. At the end of the 19th century, Havana witnessed the final moments of Spanish presence in the Americas.

The sinking of the U.S. battleship Maine in Havana's harbor in 1898 was the immediate cause of the Spanish–American War.

Republican period 

Cuba's first presidential period under Tomás Estrada Palma from 1902 to 1906 was considered to uphold the highest standards of administrative integrity in the history of the Republic of Cuba. Initially he was the President of the Cuban Republic in Arms during the Ten Years' War and again between May 20, 1902, and September 28, 1906. His collateral career as a New York City Area Educator and writer enabled Estrada Palma to create Pro-Cuban literature aimed at gaining sympathy, assistance, and publicity. He was eventually successful in garnering the attention of influential Americans. Estrada Palma was an early and persistent voice calling for the United States to intervene in Cuba on humanitarian grounds. He was the first President of Cuba. During his presidency, his major accomplishments include improving Cuba's infrastructure, communication, and public health. He is remembered in Cuba however for allowing the Platt Amendment to be enacted, which ensured American political and economic dominance over Cuba.
While Cuba had the highest ratio of hospital beds to population in Latin America, around 80% of these beds were located in the city of Havana, there was only one rural hospital and it was equipped with only 10 beds.
In 1951 the World Bank reported that between 80 and 90% of children in rural areas suffered from some form of intestinal parasites, in 1956 about 13% of the rural population had a history of typhoid and 14% at one point had tuberculosis. A study conducted in 1959 by public health authorities found that throughout the country around 72% of the population was afflicted with parasitism and in the rural areas this percentage was as high as 86.54%. Only 1 in 4 peasants were able to afford regularly eating meat, eggs and fish and chronic unemployment was at 25%. Cuba was a very unequal society with a mere 8% of landowners owning approximately 75% of the land, the bottom fifth of the population took in 2% of the national income meanwhile one-fifth of the population took in 58% of the national income this was one of the lowest rates for the bottom 20% in the world then and even now.
Cuba was also under a lot of influence from the United States to the point where the U.S. controlled 80% of Cuba's trade. In 1959 around 40% of Cuban sugar land, almost all the cattle ranches, 90% of mines and 80% of the utilities were owned by American firms.

In 1958, Cuba was a relatively well-advanced country by Latin American standards, and in some cases by world standards. On the other hand, Cuba was affected by perhaps the largest labor union privileges in Latin America, including bans on dismissals and mechanization. They were obtained in large measure "at the cost of the unemployed and the peasants", leading to disparities. Between 1933 and 1958, Cuba extended economic regulations enormously, causing economic problems. Unemployment became a problem as graduates entering the workforce could not find jobs. The middle class, which was comparable to that of the United States, became increasingly dissatisfied with unemployment and political persecution. The labor unions supported Batista until the very end. Batista stayed in power until he was forced into exile in December 1958.

Revolution 

The Cuban Revolution had domestic and international repercussions. In particular, it transformed Cuba–United States relations, although efforts to improve diplomatic relations have gained momentum in recent years such as the Cuban thaw. In the immediate aftermath of the revolution, Castro's government began a program of nationalization, centralization of the press and political consolidation that transformed Cuba's economy and civil society. The revolution also heralded an era of Cuban medical internationalism and Cuban intervention in foreign conflicts in Africa, Latin America, Southeast Asia, and the Middle East. Several rebellions occurred in the six years following 1959, mainly in the Escambray Mountains, which were defeated by the revolutionary government.
After the revolution of 1959, the new government under Fidel Castro began to improve social services, public housing, and official buildings. Nevertheless, after Castro's abrupt expropriation of all private property and industry (May 1959 onwards) under a strong communist model backed by the Soviet Union followed by the U.S. embargo, shortages that affected Cuba in general hit Havana especially hard. By 1966–68, the Cuban government had nationalized all privately owned business entities in Cuba, down to "certain kinds of small retail forms of commerce" as per law No. 1076.

An economic downturn occurred after the collapse of the Soviet Union in 1991. Soviet subsidies ended, representing billions of dollars which the Soviet Union had given the Cuban government. Many believed the revolutionary government would soon collapse, as happened to the Soviet satellite states of Eastern Europe.

After many years of economic struggle and prohibition, the socialist government has turned to tourism for revenue and has brought foreign investors to remodel the nationalized, former Manzana de Gomez building, and turn it into the Gran Hotel Manzana Kempinski La Habana, a new 5-star hotel attempting to develop a new hospitality industry. In Old Havana, a number of streets and squares have been rehabilitated in an effort to rebuild for tourists. But Old Havana is a large city, and the restoration efforts concentrate in all on less than 10% of its area.

Administration 

The governor is Reinaldo García Zapata, he was elected on January 18, 2020.

The city is administered by a city-provincial council, with a governor as chief administrative officer, thus Havana functions as both a city and a province of Cuba. The city has little autonomy and is dependent upon the national government, particularly, for much of its budgetary and overall political direction.

The national government is headquartered in Havana and plays an extremely visible role in the city's life. Moreover, the all-embracing authority of many national institutions has led to a declining role for the city government, which, nevertheless, still provides much of the essential services and has competences in education, health care, city public transport, garbage collection, small industry, agriculture, etc.

Voters elect delegates to Municipal Assemblies in competitive elections every five years, and the Municipal Assemblies are responsible for each of the city's boroughs. These assemblies elect the borough presidents and vice presidents, which are equivalents to mayors and vice mayors in the other provinces. There is only one political party, the Communist Party, but since there must be a minimum of two candidates, members of the Communist Party often run against each other. Candidates are not required to be members of the party. They are nominated directly by citizens in open meetings within each election district. Municipal Assembly delegates within the boroughs in turn elect members of the Provincial Council (until 2019 the Provincial Assembly), which in Havana serves roughly as the City Council; its president appoints the Governor and Vice Governor, who serve as the Mayor and Vice Mayor of Havana and can be either elected by the council or appointed by the president with council confirmation. There are direct elections for the city's deputies to the National Assembly based on slates, and a portion of the candidates is nominated at the local level. The People's Councils (Consejos Populares) consist of local city delegates who elect a full-time representative to preside over the body. These councils are directly responsible for the city's neighbourhoods and wards. In addition, there is involvement of "mass organizations" and representatives of local government agencies, industries and services. The 105 People's Councils in Havana cover an average of 20,000 residents.

Havana city borders are contiguous with the Mayabeque Province on the south and east and to Artemisa Province on the west, since former La Habana Province (rural) was abolished in 2010.

Geography

Location 

Havana lies on the northern coast of Cuba along the Straits of Florida, south of the Florida Keys, where the Gulf of Mexico joins the Atlantic Ocean. The city extends mostly westward and southward from the bay, which is entered through a narrow inlet and which divides into three main harbors: Marimelena, Guanabacoa, and Atarés. The Almendares River traverses the city from south to north, entering the Straits of Florida a few miles west of the bay.

There are low hills on which the city lies rise gently from the waters of the straits. A noteworthy elevation is the 200-foot-high (60-meter) limestone ridge that slopes up from the east and culminates in the heights of La Cabaña and El Morro, the sites of Spanish fortifications overlooking the eastern bay. Another notable rise is the hill to the west that is occupied by the University of Havana and the Castillo del Príncipe (Havana).

Climate 
Havana has a tropical climate that is tempered by the island's position in the belt of the trade winds and by the warm offshore currents. Under the Köppen climate classification, Havana has a tropical savanna climate (Aw) that closely borders on a tropical rainforest climate (Af) and a tropical monsoon climate (Am). The temperature seldom drops below . Rainfall is heaviest in June and October and lightest from December through April, averaging  annually. Hurricanes occasionally strike the island, but they ordinarily hit the south coast, and damage in Havana has been less than elsewhere in the country.

Tornadoes can be somewhat rare in Cuba, however, on the evening of January 28, 2019, a very rare strong F4 tornado struck the eastern side of Havana. The tornado caused extensive damage, destroying at least 90 homes, killing four people and injuring 195. By February 4, the death toll had increased to six, with 11 people still in critical condition.

The table lists temperature averages:

Districts 

The city is divided into 15 municipalities – or boroughs, which are further subdivided into 105 wards (consejos populares).

 Playa: Santa Fe, Siboney, Cubanacán, Ampliación Almendares, Miramar, Sierra, Ceiba, Buena Vista.
 Plaza de la Revolución: El Carmelo, Vedado-Malecón, Rampa, Príncipe, Plaza, Nuevo Vedado-Puentes Grandes, Colón-Nuevo Vedado, Vedado.
 Centro Habana: Cayo Hueso, Pueblo Nuevo, Los Sitios, Dragones, Colón.
 La Habana Vieja: Prado, Catedral, Plaza Vieja, Belén, San Isidro, Jesús María, Tallapiedra.
 Regla: Guaicanimar, Loma Modelo, Casablanca.
 La Habana del Este: Camilo Cienfuegos, Cojímar, Guiteras, Alturas de Alamar, Alamar Este, Guanabo, Campo Florido, Alamar-Playa.
 Guanabacoa: Mañana-Habana Nueva, Villa I, Villa II, Chivas-Roble, Debeche-Nalon, Hata-Naranjo, Peñalver-Bacuranao, Minas-Barreras.
 San Miguel del Padrón: Rocafort, Luyanó Moderno, Diezmero, San Francisco de Paula, Dolores-Veracruz, Jacomino.
 Diez de Octubre: Luyanó, Jesús del Monte, Lawton, Vista Alegre, Goyle, Sevillano, La Víbora, Santos Suárez, Tamarindo.
 Cerro: Latinoamericano, Pilar-Atares, Cerro, Las Cañas, El Canal, Palatino, Armada.
 Marianao: CAI-Los Ángeles, Pocito-Palmas, Zamora-Cocosolo, Libertad, Pogoloti-Belén-Finlay, Santa Felicia.
 La Lisa : Alturas de La Lisa, Balcón Arimao, El Cano-Valle Grande-Bello 26 y Morado, Punta Brava, Arroyo Arenas, San Agustín, Versalles-Coronela.
 Boyeros: Santiago de Las Vegas, Nuevo Santiago, Boyeros, Wajay, Calabazar, Altahabana-Capdevila, Armada-Aldabó.
 Arroyo Naranjo: Los Pinos, Poey, Víbora Park, Mantilla, Párraga, Calvario-Fraternidad, Guinera, Eléctrico, Managua, Callejas.
 Cotorro: San Pedro-Centro Cotorro, Santa Maria del Rosario, Lotería, Cuatro Caminos, Magdalena-Torriente, Alberro.

Architecture 

Havana has diverse styles of architecture, from castles built in the 16th century, to modernist high-rise buildings.
The present condition of many structures have deteriorated since 1959 or have been demolished, including the demolition of the Plaza del Vapor, built in 1835 by the architect of the Palacio de la Marquesa de Villalba Eugenio Rayneri Sorrentino the father of Eugenio Rayneri Piedra the architect of the El Capitolio of 1929. The Plaza del Vapor was demolished in 1959 by the new, revolutionary government. Numerous building collapses throughout the city have resulted in injuries and deaths due to a lack of maintenance.

Spanish 

Riches were brought from the Spanish into and through Havana as it was a key transshipment point between the new world and old world. As a result, Havana was the most heavily fortified city in the Americas. Most examples of early architecture can be seen in military fortifications such as La Fortaleza de San Carlos de la Cabana (1558–1577) designed by Battista Antonelli and the Castillo del Morro (1589–1630). This sits at the entrance of Havana Bay and provides an insight into the supremacy and wealth at that time.

Old Havana was also protected by a defensive wall begun in 1674 but had already overgrown its boundaries when it was completed in 1767, becoming the new neighborhood of Centro Habana. The influence from different styles and cultures can be seen in Havana's Spanish architecture, with a diverse range of Mudéjar architecture, Spanish, Italian, Greek and Roman. The San Carlos and San Ambrosio Seminary (18th century) is a good example of early Spanish influenced architecture. The Havana cathedral (1748–1777) dominating the Plaza de la Catedral (1749) is the best example of Cuban Baroque. Surrounding it are the former palaces of the Count de Casa-Bayona (1720–1746) Marquis de Arcos (1746) and the Marquis de Aguas Claras (1751–1775).

Iglesia del Espíritu 

The Iglesia del Espíritu Santo at No. 161 Calle Acosta was built in 1635 on the corner of Calles Cuba and Acosta. Free blacks, already numerous, devoted it to the Holy Spirit in 1638. The Espíritu Santo contains some notable paintings including a seated, post-crucifixion Christ on the right wall, and catacombs. It is considered one of the oldest temples in Havana and it is said that its main interest lies essentially in the simplicity of the beautiful stone construction.

The church was rebuilt and expanded in 1648 and given the rank of a parish. During the Spanish era it had exceptional importance, since by a Papal Bull of 1772 and a Royal Certificate of 1773, of Charles III of Spain, it was declared "Única Iglesia inmune en esta ciudad, construida en 1855." ("the only immune church in this city, built-in 1855."), which meant that any persecuted individual could find Amparo (sanctuary) in it against the action of the authorities or of justice. A metal plaque at the foot of the bell tower attests to this fact.

Many illustrious people of Havana were baptized in this church, among them the educator José de la Luz y Caballero. Bishop Gerónimo Valdés, a founder of La Casa de Beneficencia y Maternidad de La Habana, was buried in the Church; the master sepulcher of Bishop Valdés was found in 1936.

There are original paintings by the Cuban painter José Nicolás de la Escalera ("Cuba's first painter") and Aristides Fernandez (20th century), among them the large oil painting titled The Burial of Christ.

The Iglesia del Espíritu Santo's greatest interest from an architectural point of view lies in the simplicity of the coral stone construction and the lack of lavish decoration. Other elements of great importance are the funerary crypts that were discovered in 1953. The crypt is from times before the Colón Cemetery (1876) in El Vedado was built. The crypt is entered from the left of the altar and contains several catacombs.

Cuban uni-nave 
The building was built in the "uni-nave" style, as pointed out by Joaquín Weiss, a Cuban architect, and historian and one of the most authoritative authorities on the subject. Uni-nave was the style of Cuban religious constructions in the seventeenth century and meant that it originally had only one central nave. An additional side nave in the first years of the 18th century, the bell tower was built and around 1720 the vault of the presbytery was built. In 1760, Bishop D. Pedro Morell of Santa Cruz ordered the construction of a nave (8x29m) lateral to the main temple nave.

The church sits on a plinth of about 18cm that may be seen along Calles Cuba and Acosta. The building is 60m long as measured on the exterior, east–west along Calle Acosta, although from the interior it appears that the last 10m was a later addition as the walls of this ten-meter square room are thinner (along Calle Acosta) and the roof structure does not span the ten-meter dimension. There is a column in the middle of the room to distribute the weight of the roof.

There are seven bays of approximately fifty-seven centimeters in length along the main nave. The first bay at the entrance is the shortest of about five meters in length and contains a balcony above which is reached by the stairs of the belfry. The elliptical arch supported by matching pilasters at opposite walls date from 1808 which is the year of the construction of the bell tower. In the middle of the 19th century, the entire wall that faces Acosta Street was rebuilt and the main façade was remodeled. The three-story bell-tower was built in the year 1808 and it is located immediately to the left of the church upon entering, it is one of the tallest structures in Old Havana. The tower was built by the master Pedro Hernández de Santiago.

There are five windows along the Calle Acosta wall and, except for the window in the presbytery which aligns with the center of the room, do not align with the grid of the columns. Thus the windows appear to be haphazardly placed without regard for the geometry of the nave or the rhythm of the structure.

Ceiling 
The roof of the church terminates on the interior in a wooden ceiling of paired cross-tie braces and hidden tie backs springing from every column and supported on wooden corbels. The wood cross-tie brace ceiling is a common construction in Havana and may be seen in the wooden ceiling of the Church of Santo Cristo del Buen Viaje at Amargura and Cristo Streets in Havana Vieja and Iglesia de Santa Clara de Asis.

Iglesia de San Francisco de Paula 

The Alameda de Paula was the first promenade in Cuba, designed and constructed in 1776 by Antonio Fernández Trevejo, following the instructions of the Laureano de Torres y Ayala, it was created on the site of the old Rincón refuse dump. It was an embankment with two rows of poplar trees and some benches, it became one of Havana's most important social and cultural spaces, it was the model of the Paseo del Prado designed in 1925. It was given the name Alameda de Paula because of its proximity to the old Hospital and Iglesia of San Francisco de Paula. Between 1803 and 1805 the pavement was tiled, a fountain and stone benches, lampposts and the marble column were added, it qualified as a pleasant entertainment for the residents of the Villa de San Cristóbal, lacking recreational sites at that time.

In 1841, the stairs that gave access to the promenade were widened and several lampposts were added. In the year 2000, the Havana promenade was restored and extended until it reached the Iglesia de San Francisco de Paula.

Towards the end of the 17th century, the first stone of what would be the hospital for women and the church of San Francisco de Paula was placed, the buildings were expanded in 1731 with the support and donations from the City Council and orders of the different General Captains in command of the island. In 1776, it was the most important hospital in Havana, there were several generations of famous doctors that trained here.

The Presbyter of the Cathedral of Havana, don Nicolás Estévez Borges, in 1664 ordered the construction of a Hospital for Women and an adjoining church devoted to Saint Francis of Paola who was one of the founders of the Roman Catholic Order of the Minims.  San Francisco de Paula (1416–1507) was a hermit, famous for his humility and his miracles. His party is celebrated on April 2.

Both buildings were completely destroyed by a hurricane in 1730 and were rebuilt and enlarged in 1745 in the Baroque style we see today, resulting in the Royal Hospital of Havana and the Church of San Francisco de Paula.

The Havana Central Railroad, a U. S. company, in 1907 attempted to acquire the temple for its own corporate use. The Central Railroad's several attempts to acquire and eventually demolish the church were frustrated by the opposition of historian Emilio Roig de Leuchsenring and anthropologist don Fernando Ortiz. Their efforts not only stopped the demolition of the church but also got it listed as National Monument in 1944. Havana Central Railroads, however, was able to bring down the hospital upon approval from the relevant authorities at the time.

An example of the pre-Churrigueresque Baroque style, the floor plan of the Iglesia de San Francisco de Paula is typologically similar to the Iglesia de San Francisco de Asís as both ground plans are based on a Latin cross. The façade has a central arched doorway and columns at the sides, typical of Spanish churches. There is a belfry in the front, but the 3 bells were never be recovered after the hurricane of 1730. The Office of the City Historian restored the stained glass windows.

The Iglesia de San Francisco de Paula is a representative example of the Cuban Baroque of the first half of the 18th century. The portion of the church that still exists, the octagonal base of the dome, the façade, and the stained glass windows, all part of the original building of 1745, have all been restored.
The facade is similar to that of the church of Santo Domingo, in Guanabacoa and the convent of San Francisco de Asís, built on a similar date.
The nave has a barrel vault with a dome that marks the crossing. As an altarpiece, it has a stained glass window. It has the only organ that has been preserved in Cuba with its original pipe and machinery in its original location. The church contains the ashes of the Cuban violinist Claudio Brindis de Salas Garrido (1852–1911), considered one of the best violinists of his time.

Neoclassical 
Neoclassism was introduced into the city in the 1840s, at the time including Gas public lighting in 1848 and the railroad in 1837. In the second half of the 18th century, sugar and coffee production increased rapidly, which became essential in the development of Havana's most prominent architectural style. Many wealthy Habaneros took their inspiration from the French; this can be seen within the interiors of upper-class houses such as the Aldama Palace built in 1844. This is considered the most important neoclassical residential building in Cuba and typifies the design of many houses of this period with portales of neoclassical columns facing open spaces or courtyards.

In 1925 Jean-Claude Nicolas Forestier, the head of urban planning in Paris moved to Havana for five years to collaborate with architects and landscape designers. In the master planning of the city his aim was to create a harmonic balance between the classical built form and the tropical landscape. He embraced and connected the city's road networks while accentuating prominent landmarks. His influence has left a huge mark on Havana although many of his ideas were cut short by the great depression in 1929. During the first decades of the 20th century Havana expanded more rapidly than at any time during its history. Great wealth prompted architectural styles to be influenced from abroad. The peak of Neoclassicism came with the construction of the Vedado district (begun in 1859). This area features a number of set back well-proportioned buildings in the Neoclassical style.

Palacio de la Marquesa de Villalba 

Built in 1875, in the Reparto de las Las Murallas, (wide strip of land that remained after the city walls were demolished in 1863), it was the work of the architect Eugenio Rayneri y Sorrentino. Around 1880 the mansion was owned by the Count of Casa Moré. The "La Flor de José Murias" tobacco factory was installed in the building. Later, through the exploitation of rents, it became a tenement house. In 1951 some of its spaces were dedicated to housing. On its upper floor, the Spanish Center and the Israeli Center of Cuba had their headquarters.

The palace of the Marquesa de Villalba and the Mercado de Tacón were designed by the Eugenio Rayneri y Sorrentino at almost the same time, 1875 and 1876, respectively, each in a style that accommodated the particular typology (residential and commercial) thus conceiving each work with the formal element accommodating different aesthetic requirements.

The property is, after the Aldama Palace, the strongest example of Cuban Neoclassicism. The palace of the Marquesa de Villalba is in the neoclassical style, perhaps only comparable in Havana – according to Alina Castellanos – to the Aldama Palace. But while the latter limits the decoration to the natural slenderness of the colonnade, in the most classical way of the Greek Parthenon, the former uses Roman and Renaissance elaborations, hence, the arcade has been projected on pillars, the building was crowned with a considerable cornice. The neoclassical decoration can also be seen in the window covers, which take alternate forms of a triangular or semicircular pediment, and glass over the door, similar to the Plaza del Vapor.

Some interior spaces and the openings to the street on the ground floor have been heavily modified, it is still possible to appreciate the monumentality of the building in its three street facades, well proportioned, with a portal composed of a semicircular arcade that culminates in pointed arches at the ends. There are openings on the upper floor, which are alternately topped by triangular or semicircular pediments, a detail that shows a strong influence of the Italian Renaissance, which makes the Palacio one of the most openly academic of the period. There is an unusual Corinthian pilaster order attached to the upper floor, and the main portal by Calle Egido, resolved in a semicircular arch with and a cast iron door. The rest of the composition remains within the scheme of the large intramural mansions, with the ground floor, mezzanine, and main floor, located, in this case, around three interior courtyards.

Palacio de Aldama 

The Palacio de Aldama is a neoclassical mansion located diagonally opposite to the old Plaza del Vapor (Parque del Curita), and in front of the old Campo de Marte; present day Parque de la Fraternidad, in Havana, Cuba. Built in 1840 by the Dominican architect and engineer Manuel José Carrera, its main facade of columns spans one block on Calle Amistad between Calles Reina and Estrella.

The Aldama Palace was assaulted by Spanish volunteers on the night of the January 24, 1869. Its owner at that time, Don Miguel de Aldama and Alfonso – son of the building's builder – was a recognized enemy of Spain and conspirator since Narciso López's time.  A man so rich and powerful that, despite his ideas and pro Cuban views, Spain, far from punishing him, wanted to attract him with the offer of the title of marquis; Don Miguel refused. In addition, there was another reason that prompted the most intransigent Spanish element, represented by the volunteers, to the looting of that mansion and was the insistent rumor that, by the will of its owner, that royal palace would be the residence of the future presidents of Cuba.

Thus, the Spanish Volunteer Corps assaulted the palace under the pretext that Domingo del Monte had a catch of weapons inside of the Palacio. The looting of the Aldama Palace, three months after the start of the first war for independence, is linked to various events that took place under the command of Captain General Domingo Dulce y Garay, Marquis of Castell-Florit, whose main cause was the encounter between the Spaniards and the Cubans and the hostility that the volunteers felt for the ruler whom they held as weak, and whom they accused of complicity in events contrary to Spain, including, those of Miguel Aldama.
Street riots had occurred on January 12 after the volunteers during a search had found a stash of weapons in a house on Calle Carmen during the burial of Camilo Cepeda, a young Cuban killed in jail. The Volunteers returned on the 24th and a troop of them fired their weapons into the ‘’El Louvre’’ café, those who tried to flee, were attacked by bayonet. There were seven dead and numerous wounded, all of them Spanish.

The Third and Fifth battalions, and the Ligeros battalion, concentrated before the Palace and knocked down one of the doors. They said to look for weapons and, indeed, they found them, but not of those that could be used in the manigua in the war against Spain, it was a collection of ancient weapons ——Japanese, Hindu, Norman, Inca, etc.—— that the Aldama family had collected. The Spanish Volunteers destroyed the art gallery and searched the cabinets and appropriated everything that could be taken, what could not be carried, they destroyed: crockery, lamps, crystals, books, art objects of all kinds. They set fire to the damask or lace curtains and doors and windows were torn off of the masonry, or shot. They also visited the wineries of the Palace, lit a bonfire in the Field of Mars and had the carved furniture and oriental tapestries burned.

Royal Palm Hotel 

The Royal Palm Hotel is located on the corner of San Rafael and Industria. It was inaugurated as "Edificio Luis. E. del Valle", in honor of the sugar magnate who owned the building. However, it was soon sold to Canadian Wilbur E. Todgham, who turned it into the famed Royal Palm Hotel.
A characteristic that placed the Royal Palm among the favorites of its time was that almost all the rooms had a private bathroom with hot running water. The building had two elevators and a fire-protected staircase. In the 1930s, the hotel was bought by Pascual Morán Pérez, a businessman of Spanish origin who stood out in the field of hospitality in Cuba. Morán was a very skilled man in marketing matters and knew how to take advantage of the brand built by the previous owner to position himself in the market. He marketed his hotel as the best and most central in the city.
n the 1960s this hotel was nationalized, like many other properties in the city. There is no exact reference to how and when, but the building gradually became family homes. The practice of expropriating hotels and converting them into multi-family buildings was one of the strategies of the revolutionary state to solve the housing problem in Cuba.

The commercial function of the ground floor has been preserved to date, taking advantage of its excellent location on Boulevard de San Rafael. Taking into account the architectural values of this building and its socio-cultural importance within the urban landscape in which it is located, the building received a major restoration in 2000, with the support of the Provincial Council of Seville, Spain.

Art deco

Bacardi Building 

The Bacardi Building (Edificio Bacardí) is Havana landmark designed by the architects Esteban Rodríguez-Castells and Rafael Fernández Ruenes and completed in 1930. It is located on the corner of Calles Monserrate and San Juan de Dios on a 1,320sq meter lot in Las Murallas, Old Havana. The building is in the art deco style that was popular internationally in the early decades of the 20th century.

The Bacardi Building was designed to be the headquarters for the Bacardi Rum Company; it was nationalized by the Castro government in the early 1960s. In 2001, the building was restored by an Italian construction firm. The interior retains the original decorations in marble and granite. It is regarded as one of the finest Art Deco buildings in Latin America.

The building was the outcome of an architectural design competition. The owners of the Bacardi company invited a number of architects to present their design proposals for a new headquarters building offering 1,000 pesos to the winner. The competition was made up of a panel of judges that included Henri Schueg Chassin, president of Bacardi, and the architects Leonardo Morales y Pedroso, the architect for Colegio Belen, Enrique Gil, Emilio de Soto, and Pedro Martínez Inclán. The first prize was awarded to architects Esteban Rodríguez-Castells and Rafael Fernández Ruenes. José Menéndez Menéndez was the architect-engineer in the project.

Construction of the building started on January 6, 1930, and was completed by the 300-day deadline the company had set for December. Poor conditions of the land required that the foundation use piles of hardwood (jiqui and júcaro negro) and high strength concrete. At the peak of the building (47m) is a bronze sculpture of the company logo, a fruit bat. Its design gives the building a unique chromatic effect and a decorative element of Catalan modernism. At the brim of the building are inflected flat panel sculptures of sirens.

The first floor contained a bar with column archways where patrons of the restaurant in the mezzanine area could overlook the bar while they dined. It was open to the public and known to have many celebrities who frequented. Most of the marble and granite were imported from Europe: Germany, Sweden, Norway, Italy, France, Belgium and Hungary.

With an area of 1,075sq. meters and 7.25meters of support, the first floor walls, floor, and ceiling are adorned in pink granite from Bavaria, and the two halls are of green marble from floor to ceiling. The construction work was carried out by the company Grasyma of Wansiedel, Bavaria of Germany, which took great care in the fine details of the work and the time sensitivity of the project deadline.

Construction was completed in December 1930 and at the time it was the tallest building in Havana.

López Serrano Building 

Designed by the architect Ricardo Mira in 1929, who in 1941 designed La Moderna Poesia bookstore on Obispo Street for the same owner, the López Serrano Building was the tallest residential building in Cuba until the construction of the FOCSA Building in 1956. The congressman, senator, and presidential candidate Eduardo Chibás was living on the fourteenth-floor penthouse when he committed suicide in August 1951 on the air at CMQ Radio Station.

The construction of the building was promoted by José Antonio López Serrano, a publisher who ran La Moderna Poesía. He was the son of Ana Luísa Serrano and José López Rodríguez, "Pote", a banker with ties to publishing.

Pote arrived in Cuba as a poor and illiterate teenager who became an influential banker with ties to the government. In 1890 Pote married Ana Luísa Serrano, a wealthy widow who owned one of the best bookstores in Havana, La Moderna Poesía. After the marriage, Pote took charge of the business opening several branches in other locations in Cuba. José López's fortune was due not only to his advantageous marriage to Ana Luísa but also from supporting the Cuban independence cause. Relations with the main Cuban leaders would bring important economic benefits. Among these political alliances was the figure of General José Miguel Gómez, whom Pote financed the 1907 electoral campaign that would propel Gómez to the Presidency of the Republic. In 1908 Pote got an exclusive contract to print the tickets of the National Lottery, which translated into extensive financial benefits. He monopolized the printing of official documents such as bonds, stocks, stamps and bank notes, printed in La Casa del Timbre. Later, he would obtain from the Government of Gómez the concession for the construction of an iron bridge over the Almendares River connecting Calle Calzada with Miramar. José López Rodríguez committed suicide on March 28, 1921, at the time, he had accumulated 93million dollars.

Modernism 
Known by buildings of high-quality, modernist architecture transformed much of the city. Examples are the Havana Hilton Hotel of (1958), the Radiocentro CMQ Building of 1955 by Martín Domínguez Esteban architect of the FOCSA Building in 1956, and the Edificio del Seguro Médico, Havana by Antonio Quintana Simonetti.

Hotel Tryp Habana Libre 

Hotel Tryp Habana Libre is one of the larger hotels in Cuba, situated in Vedado, Havana. The hotel has 572 rooms in a 25-floor tower at Calle 23 ("La Rampa") and Calle L. Opened in 1958 as the Habana Hilton, the hotel famously served as the residence of Fidel Castro and other revolutionaries throughout 1959, after their capture of Havana.

The Habana Hilton was constructed at a cost of $24million, under the personal auspices of President Fulgencio Batista. It was built as an investment by the Caja de Retiro y Asistencia Social de los Trabajadores Gastronomicos, the pension plan of the Cuban catering workers' union, with additional financing from the Banco de Fomento Agricola e Industrial de Cuba (BANFAIC). It was operated by the American Hilton Hotels International group and was designed by the well-known Los Angeles architect Welton Becket, who had previously designed the Beverly Hilton for the chain. Becket designed the 27-story Habana Hilton in collaboration with Havana-based architects Lin Arroyo, and Gabriela Menéndez. Arroyo was the Minister of Public Works under Batista. The hotel was constructed by the Frederick Snare Corporation.

The architectural historian Peter Moruzzi, author of Havana Before Castro, notes what the Hilton meant to Batista:
 “Batista considered the Habana Hilton among his proudest achievements, its huge blue-lit rooftop ‘Hilton’ name announcing to the world that the eminent Conrad Hilton had confidence in Cuba's future – that the country was a safe place in which to invest – and that tourists could now find in Havana the modern comforts they expected in a top international resort.”

The Habana Hilton was Latin America's tallest and largest hotel. It boasted 630 guest rooms, including 42 suites; an elegant casino; six restaurants and bars, including a Trader Vic's and a rooftop bar; a huge supper club; extensive convention facilities; a shopping arcade; an outdoor pool surrounded by cabanas; and two underground garages with a capacity of 500 cars. The hotel also featured artwork commissioned from some of the most important Cuban modern artists of the day, including an enormous mosaic mural by Amelia Peláez over the main entrance and a tiled wall mural by René Portocarrero in the second-floor Antilles Bar overlooking the pool terrace.

The Habana Hilton opened with five days of festivities, from March 19–23, 1958, with Conrad Hilton himself in attendance, joined by his companion, actress Ann Miller. Hilton was joined by 300 invited guests, including socialite Virginia Warren, daughter of Chief Justice Earl Warren; renowned Hollywood columnist Hedda Hopper; actress Terry Moore; actress Dorothy Johnson; married radio hosts Tex McCrary and Jinx Falkenburg; actress Linda Cristal; dancer Vera-Ellen; actor Don Murray; actress Dolores Hart; ABC network President Leonard Goldenson; and journalist Leonard Lyons. A formal blessing ceremony was held in the hotel's lobby on March 22, 1958, attended by Cuba's First Lady, Marta Fernandez de Batista; Francisco Aguirre, head of the catering workers' union; José Suárez Rivas, Minister of Labor; and other dignitaries. The ceremony was followed by a luncheon, with speeches by Hilton and Aguirre, and a huge gala dinner and ball in the hotel's grand ballroom.

The casino in the hotel was leased for $1million a year to a group consisting of Roberto "Chiri" Mendoza, his brother Mario Mendoza, Clifford "Big Juice" Jones, Kenneth F. Johnson, and Sidney Orseck.  Roberto Mendoza was a wealthy Cuban contractor and sugar planter who was a business associate of President Batista; Mario Mendoza was a lawyer; Orseck was an attorney from New York; Johnson was a senator in the Nevada state legislature and Jones was a former lieutenant governor of Nevada who had ownership interests in a number of Las Vegas casinos. Hilton officials said that 13 groups tried to lease the casino and 12 were "turned down because they either had underworld connections or had refused to subject themselves to rigid investigation." Speculation surfaced that the murder of Gambino crime family boss Albert Anastasia in October 1957 was tied to his interest in securing an ownership stake in the Hilton's casino. Roberto Mendoza and Santo Trafficante Jr., who had substantial gambling interests in Cuba, were both in New York at the time of Anastasia's murder. The police investigation of the murder focused on this theory for a while but later looked at other theories.  The murder was never solved.

Radiocentro CMQ Building 

The Radiocentro CMQ Building complex is a former radio and television production facility and office building at the intersection of Calle L and La Rampa in El Vedado, Cuba. It was modeled after Raymond Hood's 1933 Rockefeller Center in New York City. With 1,650 seats, the theater first opened on December 23, 1947, under the name Teatro Warner Radiocentro, it was owned by brothers Goar and Abel Mestre. Today the building serves as the headquarters of the Cuban Institute of Radio and Television (ICRT).

For the construction of this building, the Havana building authorities granted a permit in 1947 amending the ordinances that were then in effect in El Vedado prohibiting the construction of buildings of more than three storeys. This statute was modified six years later to expand the construction of up to four floors because many planners and owners claimed the need to authorize them to build taller buildings in the area.

The building was set back from the property line five meters, adding four meters for an arcade which allowed a distance from the road while adjusting to the strong slope of 23rd Street, in this way the arcade became a wide gallery and at the same time sub-divided the basement level.

This gallery became the covered hall of the cinema located in the upper corner with Calle L. The building had an expressionist curved cover of a large scale relating to the important intersection. This same scale was adopted in the restaurant that was located on the opposite corner on M. Street. The wide gallery gives access to the lobby of the office building. The third building is set up by a prismatic piece on M Street, also set back to emphasize the two corners.

The cinema with a capacity for 1,700 spectators was originally a Cinerama which used three projectors and a twenty-five-foot radius screen. It had a small stage in which short-term shows could be offered, to entertain the audience in the middle of the films.

The radio station CMQ occupied part of the offices of the ten-story building, which was attached to the block of rental offices. In this area, a part of the land had also been reserved for future television installations, which had not yet been built. In one of its studios, Studio Number 2 was the venue not only of radio program transmissions but also that studio was the location of all or most of the RCA Victor recordings in Cuba from 1948 to 1959. The label at the CMQ complex was Discuba, a Cuban record label founded in 1959 by RCA Victor. It released music by several internationally successful artists such as Celia Cruz, Beny Moré, Orquesta Aragón and La Lupe.

The ground floor, which was common for the entire complex, had different types of commercial establishments: several exhibition halls, a bank, a restaurant, and a cafeteria. The pedestrian circulation was designed in such a way so that it made it necessary to pass in front of these premises.

The Radiocentro CMQ Building of 1947, built on 23rd Street between Calles L and M in El Vedado, was the first mixed use building in Cuba. The architectural program of the building included businesses, offices, radio, and television studios, as well as the Cinerama Warner cinema. This project joined the expertise of the structural engineers, the U.S. firm Purdy and Henderson, Engineers, and the architects Martín Domínguez Esteban and Miguel Gastón and Emilio del Junco, all members of the ATEC (Cuban section of the CIAM). The building had a great impact since it was published in the magazine L'Architecture d'aujourd'hui.

The building is a series of independent boxes, it was designed by the Basque architect Martín Domínguez Esteban (1897–1970). Esteban had been the architect of the Hipódromo de la Zarzuela, along with Carlos Arniches.
The CMQ Building was loosely modeled after Raymond Hood's Rockefeller Center. The Radiocentro CMQ Building had an impact on many Cuban architects who subscribed to Modern architecture and buildings that would be built in the following years, such as the Hotel Habana Hilton across La Rampa (now known as Hotel Habana Libre) designed by Welton Becket and associates with the Cuban architectural firm of Arroyo and Menéndez, the 1958, the twenty-three-story Edificio Seguro Medico by Antonio Quintana, among others.

Walter Gropius, during a visit he made in 1949 to Havana referred to the Radiocentro CMQ Building to defend the need for architectural teamwork and collaboration among architects: It is impossible for the architect to know all of the equipment and installation requirements; therefor, it is necessary for the cooperation of architectural specialists.

FOCSA Building 

The FOCSA Building is a residential block in the Vedado neighborhood of Havana, Cuba. It was named after the contracting company Fomento de Obras y Construcciones, Sociedad Anónima, and the architects were Ernesto Gómez Sampera (1921–2004), Mercedes Diaz (his wife), and Martín Domínguez Esteban (1897–1970), who was the architect of the Radiocentro CMQ Building. The structural engineer was Luis Sáenz Duplace, of the firm Sáenz, Cancio & Martín, and professor of engineering at the University of Havana. The civil engineers were Bartolome Bestard and Manuel Padron. Gustavo Becquer and Fernando H.Meneses were the mechanical and electrical engineers, respectively. It is located on a site bordered by Calles 17 and M and Calles 19 and N in the Vedado.

The Edificio Focsa (1956) represents Havana's economic dominance at the time. This 35-story complex was conceived and based on Corbusian ideas of a self-contained city within a city. It contained 400 apartments, garages, a school, a supermarket, and a restaurant on the top floor. This was the tallest high-strength concrete structure in the world at the time (using no steel frame) and the ultimate symbol of luxury and excess.

The building rises to a height of 402' above its footings; 11" bearing walls separate the apartments and in turn support the 6-3/4" reinforced concrete slabs at each level. The bearing walls are solid and have no openings except at the basement and lobby floors to facilitate access between rooms. There is an additional concrete mass at the center of the Y, (apartments F and G), to increase resistance to lateral forces. The walls extend through the rear wall to support the corridors. The wall and slab structural system form a three-dimensional lattice resisting horizontal forces. A high strength concrete mix from 3,000 to 7,000psi. was used. The tower and corridors show prefabricated panels on the exterior. Reinforced concrete columns support the podium and the stories below. The residential block, the 'Y,' is supported by 13 11-inch walls. There are coral tiles on the ground floor.

The building was chosen in February 1997 by the Unión Nacional de Arquitectos e Ingenieros de la Construcción de Cuba (UNAICC) as one of the seven wonders of Cuban civil engineering.
The FOCSA has 39 floors 4 of which are dedicated to commercial use, two floors are for parking. Twenty-eight floors have 13 residences each. The 34th floor has six penthouses on a plinth made possible by the structural walls which stop below this floor. Each penthouse is the size of two apartments (A+B, C+D, E+F, etc.). The penthouses have a dedicated elevator and patio-courtyards open to the sky. All apartment floors are terrazzo on cinders.

The site of the FOCSA may be divided into three parts:
 A shallow, mixed-use “wall and slab” Y of 35 floors above a base.
 The podium of outdoor amenities including two swimming pools and a club for guests and tenants. The podium covers the entire site.
 Four floors of building services, commercial spaces, and parking for 500 cars located below the podium.

Apartments are a one-half level up or down from the service and tenant corridors. A typical floor contains 13 apartments, five have two bedrooms and a maid's room. The cost of the apartments was $21,500 for the larger units in the center and $17,500 for the smaller ones. It was stipulated that an additional $30 per each floor was charged the higher up in the building the unit was located, the highest apartments were the first to be sold.

Located in the tower are the building's four tenant and two service elevators and two sets of stairs. One of the service elevators is dedicated to the restaurant and the observation floor. The other service elevator is for the apartments and is linked to the service corridors. The tower also contains offices on the 37th floor for the restaurant, “La Torre,” on the 38th floor and an observation room on the 39th floor.

The podium contains a clubhouse, and offices and swimming pools for adults and children. It has gardens, lighted paths, and benches. There is a ramp to the street located at the corner of 19th and M, the podium was used as a staging area during the construction of the project. Below the podium at the fourth level are building offices.

Edificio del Seguro Médico 

The Edificio del Seguro Médico is a commercial building in El Vedado, Havana. Built between 1955 and 1958, it was designed as a mixed use building for apartments and offices for the headquarters of the National Medical Insurance Company by Antonio Quintana Simonetti.

In regards to Edificio del Seguro Médico an architect from the Universidad de Oriente, Santiago de Cuba, Carlos Alberto Odio Soto made the following observation:

Today the building houses the Cuban Ministry of Public Health and the Prensa Latina Agency. The only complete package of information about the building is the slides that were presented for the architectural contest, collected in the magazine 'Arquitectura', nº 269, of 1955 published by the College of Architects of Havana.

Cityscape 

Contemporary Havana can essentially be described as three cities in one: Old Havana, Vedado, and the newer suburban districts. Old Havana, with its narrow streets and overhanging balconies, is the traditional centre of part of Havana's commerce, industry, and entertainment, as well as being a residential area.

To the west a newer section, centred on the uptown area known as Vedado, has become the rival of Old Havana for commercial activity and nightlife. The Capitolio Nacional building marks the beginning of Centro Habana, a working-class neighborhood that lies between Vedado and Old Havana. Barrio Chino and the Real Fabrica de Tabacos Partagás, one of Cuba's oldest cigar factories is located in the area.

A third Havana is that of the more affluent residential and industrial districts that spread out mostly to the west. Among these is Marianao, one of the newer parts of the city, dating mainly from the 1920s. Some of the suburban exclusivity was lost after the revolution, many of the suburban homes having been nationalized by the Cuban government to serve as schools, hospitals, and government offices. Several private country clubs were converted to public recreational centres. Miramar, located west of Vedado along the coast, remains Havana's exclusive area; mansions, foreign embassies, diplomatic residences, upscale shops, and facilities for wealthy foreigners are common in the area. The International School of Havana is located in the Miramar neighborhood.

In the 1980s many parts of Old Havana, including the Plaza de Armas, became part of a projected 35-yearmultimillion-dollar restoration project, for Cubans to appreciate their past and boost tourism. In the past ten years, with the assistance of foreign aid and under the support of local city historian Eusebio Leal Spengler, large parts of Habana Vieja have been renovated. The city is moving forward with their renovations, with most of the major plazas (Plaza Vieja, Plaza de la Catedral, Plaza de San Francisco and Plaza de Armas) and major tourist streets (Obispo and Mercaderes) near completion.

Demography 

By the end of 2012 official Census, 19.1% of the population of Cuba lived in Havana. According to the census of 2012, the population was 2,106,146. The city has an average life expectancy of 76.81 years at birth. In 2009, there were 1,924 people living with HIV/AIDS in the city, 78.9% of these are men, and 21.1% being women.

According to the 2012 official census (the Cuban census and similar studies use the term "skin color" instead of "race").
 White: 58.4%, (Spanish descent were most common)
 Mestizo or Mulatto (mixed race): 26.4%
 Black: 15.2%
 Asian: 0.2%

As with the other Caribbean nations, there are few mestizos in Havana (and Cuba as a whole), in contrast to many other Latin American countries, because the indigenous Taíno population was virtually wiped out by Eurasian diseases in the earliest period of the Spanish conquest.

Havana agglomeration grew rapidly during the first half of the 20th century reaching 1million inhabitants in the 1943 census. The con-urbanization expanded over the Havana municipality borders into neighbor municipalities of Marianao, Regla and Guanabacoa. Starting from the 1980s, the city's population is growing slowly as a result of balanced development policies, low birth rate, its relatively high rate of emigration abroad, and controlled domestic migration. Because of the city and country's low birth rate and high life expectancy, its age structure is similar to a developed country, with Havana having an even higher proportion of elderly than the country as a whole.

The Cuban government controls the movement of people into Havana on the grounds that the Havana metropolitan area (home to nearly 20% of the country's population) is overstretched in terms of land use, water, electricity, transportation, and other elements of the urban infrastructure. There is a population of internal migrants to Havana nicknamed "palestinos" (Palestinians), sometimes considered a racist term, these mostly hail from the eastern region of Oriente.

The city's significant minority of Chinese, mostly Cantonese ancestors, were brought in the mid-19th century by Spanish settlers via the Philippines with work contracts and after completing 8-year contracts many Chinese immigrants settled permanently in Havana. Before the revolution the Chinese population counted to over 200,000, today, Chinese ancestors could count up to 100,000. Chinese born/ native Chinese (mostly Cantonese as well) are around 400 presently. There are some 3,000 Russians living in the city; as reported by the Russian Embassy in Havana, most are women married to Cubans who had studied in the Soviet Union. Havana also shelters other non-Cuban population of an unknown size. There is a population of several thousand North African teen and pre-teen refugees.
Between 2018, the most recent census, and the mid-Twentieth Century census of 1953, Havana's population has grown by an estimated 87 percent, a growth rate typical of most Latin American cities.

Religion 
Roman Catholics form the largest religious group in Havana. Havana is one of the three Metropolitan sees on the island (the others being Camagüey and Santiago), with two suffragan bishoprics: Matanzas and Pinar del Río. Its patron saint is San Cristóbal (Saint Christopher), to whom the cathedral is devoted. it also has a minor basilica, Basílica Santuario Nacional de Nuestra Señora de la Caridad del Cobre and two other national shrines, Jesús Nazareno del Rescate and San Lázaro (El Rincón). It received papal visits from three successive supreme pontiffs: Pope John Paul II (January 1998), Pope Benedict XVI (March 2012) and Pope Francis (September 2015).

The Jewish community in Havana has reduced after the Revolution from once having embraced more than 15,000 Jews, many of whom had fled Nazi persecution and subsequently left Cuba to Miami or moved to Israel after Castro took to power in 1959. The city once had five synagogues, but only three remain (one Orthodox, and two Conservative: one Conservative Ashkenazi and one Conservative Sephardic), Beth Shalom Grand Synagogue is one of them and another that is a hybrid of all 3 put together. In February 2007 the New York Times estimated that there were about 1,500 known Jews living in Havana.

Economy 

Havana has a diversified economy, with traditional sectors, such as manufacturing, construction, transportation and communications, and new or revived ones such as biotechnology and tourism.

The city's economy first developed on the basis of its location, which made it one of the early great trade centers in the New World. Sugar and a flourishing slave trade first brought riches to the city, and later, after independence, it became a renowned resort. Despite efforts by Fidel Castro's government to spread Cuba's industrial activity to all parts of the island, Havana remains the center of much of the nation's industry.

The traditional sugar industry, upon which the island's economy has been based for three centuries, is centered elsewhere on the island and controls some three-fourths of the export economy. But light manufacturing facilities, meat-packing plants, and chemical and pharmaceutical operations are concentrated in Havana. Other food-processing industries are also important, along with shipbuilding, vehicle manufacturing, production of alcoholic beverages (particularly rum), textiles, and tobacco products, particularly the world-famous Habanos cigars. Although the harbors of Cienfuegos and Matanzas, in particular, have been developed under the revolutionary government, Havana remains Cuba's primary port facility; 50% of Cuban imports and exports pass through Havana. The port also supports a considerable fishing industry.

In 2000, nearly 89% of the city's officially recorded labor force worked for government-run agencies, institutions or enterprises. Havana, on average, has the country's highest incomes and human development indicators. After the collapse of the Soviet Union, Cuba re-emphasized tourism as a major industry leading to its recovery. Tourism is now Havana and Cuba's primary economic source.

Havana's economy is still in flux, despite Raul Castro's embrace of free enterprise in 2011. Though there was an uptick in small businesses in 2011, many have since gone out of business, due to lack of business and income on the part of the local residents, whose salaries average $20 per month.

Commerce and finance 
After the Revolution, Cuba's traditional capitalist free-enterprise system was replaced by a heavily socialized economic system. In Havana, Cuban-owned businesses and U.S.-owned businesses were nationalized and today most businesses operate solely under state control.

In Old Havana and throughout Vedado there are several small private businesses, such as shoe-repair shops or dressmaking facilities. Banking as well is also under state control, and the National Bank of Cuba, headquartered in Havana, is the control center of the Cuban economy. Its branches in some cases occupy buildings that were in pre-revolutionary times the offices of Cuban or foreign banks.

In the late 1990s Vedado, located along the atlantic waterfront, started to represent the principal commercial area. It was developed extensively between 1930 and 1960, when Havana developed as a major destination for U.S. tourists; high-rise hotels, casinos, restaurants, and upscale commercial establishments, many reflecting the art deco style.

Vedado is today Havana's financial district, the main banks, airline companies offices, shops, most businesses headquarters, numerous high-rise apartments and hotels, are located in the area. The University of Havana is located in Vedado.

Tourism 

The city has long been a popular attraction for tourists. Between 1915 and 1930, Havana hosted more tourists than any other location in the Caribbean. The influx was due in large part to Cuba's proximity to the United States, where restrictive prohibition on alcohol and other pastimes stood in stark contrast to the island's traditionally relaxed attitude to leisure pursuits. A pamphlet published by E.C. Kropp Co., Milwaukee, WI, between 1921 and 1939 promoting tourism in Havana, Cuba, can be found in the University of Houston Digital Library, Havana, Cuba, The Summer Land of the World, Digital Collection.

With the deterioration of Cuba – United States relations and the imposition of the trade embargo on the island in 1961, tourism dropped drastically and did not return to anything close to its pre-revolution levels until 1989. The revolutionary government in general, and Fidel Castro in particular, opposed any considerable development of tourism. In 1982, the Cuban government passed a foreign investment code which opened a number of sectors to foreign capital.

Through the creation of firms open to such foreign investment (such as Cubanacan), Cuba began to attract capital for hotel development, managing to increase the number of tourists from 130,000 (in 1980) to 326,000 (by the end of that decade).

Havana has also been a popular health tourism destination for more than 20 years. Foreign patients travel to Cuba, Havana in particular, for a wide range of treatments including eye-surgery, neurological disorders such as multiple sclerosis and Parkinson's disease, and orthopedics. Many patients are from Latin America, although medical treatment for retinitis pigmentosa, often known as night blindness, has attracted many patients from Europe and North America.
Havana attracts over amillion tourists annually, the Official Census for Havana reports that in 2010 the city was visited by 1,176,627 international tourists, a 20% increase from 2005.

Poverty and slums 

The years after the Soviet Union collapsed in 1991, the city, and Cuba in general have suffered decades of economic deterioration, including Special Period of the 1990s. The national government does not have an official definition of poverty. The government researchers argue that "poverty" in most commonly accepted meanings does not really exist in Cuba, but rather that there is a sector of the population that can be described as "at risk" or "vulnerable" using internationally accepted measures.

The generic term "slum" is seldom used in Cuba, substandard housing is described: housing type, housing conditions, building materials, and settlement type. The National Housing Institute considers units in solares (a large inner-city mansion or older hotel or boarding house subdivided into rooms, sometimes with over 60 families) and shanty towns to be the "precarious housing stock" and tracks their number. Most slum units are concentrated in the inner-city municipalities of Old Havana and Centro Habana, as well as such neighborhoods as Atarés in Regla. People living in slums have access to the same education, health care, job opportunities and social security as those who live in formerly privileged neighborhoods. Shanty towns are scattered throughout the city except for in a few central areas.

Over 9% of Havana's population live in cuartería (solares, ciudadela), 3.3% in shanty towns, and 0.3% in refugee shelters. This does not include an estimate of the number of people living in housing in "fair" or "poor" condition because in many cases these units do not necessarily constitute slum housing but rather are basically sound dwellings needing repairs. According to Instituto Nacional de Vivienda (National Housing Institute) official figures, in 2001, 64% of Havana's 586,768 units were considered in "good" condition, up from 50% in 1990. Some 20% were in "fair" condition and 16% in "poor" condition. Partial or total building collapses are not uncommon, although the number had been cut in half by the end of the 1990s as the worst units disappeared and others were repaired. Buildings in Old Havana and Centro Habana are especially exposed to the elements: high humidity, the corrosive effects of salt spray from proximity to the coast, and occasional flooding. Most areas of the city, especially the highly populated districts, are in urban decay.

Transport

Airports 

Havana is served by José Martí International Airport. The airport is Cuba's main international and domestic gateway, it connects Havana with the rest of the Caribbean, North, Central and South America, Europe and one destination in Africa.

The city is also served by Playa Baracoa Airport which is small airport to the west of city used for some domestic flights, primarily Aerogaviota.

Rail 

Havana has a network of suburban, interurban and long-distance rail lines. The railways are nationalized and run by the FFCC (Ferrocarriles de Cuba – Railways of Cuba). The FFCC connects Havana with all the provinces of Cuba, and the Havana Suburban Railway serves the city. The main railway stations are: Central Rail Station, La Coubre Rail Station, Casablanca Station, and Estación de Tulipán.

In 2000 the Union de Ferrocarriles de Cuba bought French first class airconditioned coaches. New Chinese made and Russian made coaches for distance trains debuted in the 2010s, and some now serve suburban services.

In the 1980s there were plans for a Metro system in Havana similar to Moscow's, as a result of the Soviet Union influence in Cuba at the time. The studies of geology and finance made by Cuban, Czech and Soviet specialists were already well advanced in the 1980s. The Cuban press showed the construction project and the course route, linking municipalities and neighborhoods in the capital. In the late 1980s the project had already begun, each mile (1.6km) of track was worth a million dollars at the time, but with the fall of the Soviet Union in 1991 the project was later dropped.

Interurban 
An interurban line, known as the Hershey Electric Railway, built in 1917 runs from Casablanca (across the harbor from Old Havana) to Hershey and on to Matanzas.

Tramway 

Havana operated a tram system until 1952, which began as a horsecar system, Ferro Carril Urbano de la Habana in 1858, merged with rival coach operator in 1863 as Empresa del Ferro-Carril Urbano y Omnibus de La Habana and later electrified in 1900 under new foreign owners as Havana Electric Railway Company. Ridership decline resulted in bankruptcy in 1950 with new owner Autobus Modernos SA abandoning the systems in favor of buses and the remaining cars were sold to Matanzas in 1952.

Roads 
The city's road network is quite extensive, and has broad avenues, main streets and major access roads to the city such as the Autopista Nacional (A1), Carretera Central and Via Blanca. The road network has been under construction and growth since the Spanish era but is undergoing a major deterioration due to low maintenance.
Motorways (autopistas) include:
 A1 – Autopista Nacional, from Havana to Santa Clara and Sancti Spiritus, with additional short sections near Santiago and Guantanamo
 A4 – Autopista Este-Oeste, from Havana to Pinar del Río
 Via Blanca, to Matanzas and Varadero
 Havana ring road, which starts at a  under the entrance to Havana Harbor
 Autopista del Mediodia, from Havana to San Antonio de los Baños
 an autopista from Havana to Melena del Sur
 an autopista from Havana to Mariel

Education 

The national government assumes all responsibility for education, and there are adequate primary, secondary, and vocational training schools throughout Cuba. The schools are of varying quality and education is free and compulsory at all levels except higher learning, which is also free.

The University of Havana, located in the Vedado section of Havana, was established in 1728 and was regarded as a leading institution of higher learning in the Western Hemisphere. Soon after the Revolution, the university, as well as all other educational institutions, were nationalized. Since then several other universities have opened, like the Higher Learning Polytechnic Institute José Antonio Echeverría where the vast majority of today's Cuban engineers are taught.

The Cuban National Ballet School with 4,350 students is one of the largest ballet schools in the world and the most prestigious ballet school in Cuba.

Landmarks and historical centers 

 Habana Vieja: contains the core of the original city of Havana. It was declared a UNESCO World Heritage Site.
 Plaza Vieja: a plaza in Old Havana, it was the site of executions, processions, bullfights, and fiestas.
 Fortress San Carlos de la Cabaña, a fortress located on the east side of the Havana bay, La Cabaña is the most impressive fortress from Spanish times, particularly its walls constructed at the end of the 18th century.
 El Capitolio Nacional: built in 1929 as the Senate and House of Representatives, the colossal building is recognizable by its dome which dominates the city's skyline. Inside stands the third largest indoor statue in the world, La Estatua de la República. Nowadays, the Cuban Academy of Sciences headquarters and the Museo Nacional de Historia Natural (the National Museum of Natural History) has its venue within the building and contains the largest natural history collection in the country.
 El Morro Castle: is a fortress guarding the entrance to Havana bay; Morro Castle was built because of the threat to the harbor from pirates.
 Fortress San Salvador de la Punta: a small fortress built in the 16th century, at the western entry point to the Havana harbor, it played a crucial role in the defense of Havana during the initial centuries of Spanish presence. It houses some twenty old guns and military antiques.
 Christ of Havana: Havana's 20-meter (66ft) marble statue of Christ (1958) blesses the city from the east hillside of the bay, much like the famous Cristo Redentor in Rio de Janeiro.
 The Great Theatre of Havana: is an opera house famous particularly for the National Ballet of Cuba, it sometimes hosts performances by the National Opera. The theater is also known as concert hall, García Lorca, the biggest in Cuba.
 The Malecon/Sea wall: is the avenue that runs along the north coast of the city, beside the seawall. The Malecón is the most popular avenue of Havana, it is known for its sunsets.
 Hotel Nacional de Cuba: an Art Deco National Hotel famous in the 1950s as a gambling and entertainment complex.
 Museo de la Revolución: located in the former Presidential Palace, with the yacht Granma on display behind the museum.
 Necrópolis Cristóbal Colón: a cemetery and open-air museum, it is one of the most famous cemeteries in Latin America, known for its beauty and magnificence. The cemetery was built in 1876 and has nearly 1million tombs. Some gravestones are decorated with sculpture by Ramos Blancos, among others.

Old city 

In 1555, Old Havana was destroyed by the French corsair Jacques de Sores. The pirate had taken Havana easily, overpowering the few defenders, plundering the city, and burning much of it to the ground, but he left without obtaining the enormous wealth that he had been hoping to find there. After the incident, the Spanish brought soldiers into the city and built fortresses and walls to protect it. Construction of Castillo de la Real Fuerza, the first fortress built, was begun in 1558, and was overseen by engineer Bartolomé Sanchez.
Havana was founded by the Spanish November 16, 1519, in the natural harbor of the Bay of Havana. It became a stopping point for the treasure laden Spanish galleons on the crossing between the New World and the Old World. In the 17th century, it was one of the main shipbuilding centers. The city was built in baroque and neoclassical styles. Many buildings have fallen into ruin in the latter half of the 20th century, but a number are being restored. The narrow streets of Old Havana contain many buildings, accounting for perhaps as many as one-third of the approximately 3,000 buildings found in Old Havana. It is the ancient city formed from the port, the official center, and the Plaza de Armas.

Old Havana resembles Cadiz and Tenerife. Alejo Carpentier called it "de las columnas" (of the columns), but it could also be named for the gateways, the revoco, the deterioration and the rescue, the intimacy, the shade, the cool, the courtyards. There are all the big ancient monuments, the forts, the convents and churches, the palaces, the alleys, the arcade. The Cuban State had undertaken enormous efforts to preserve and restore Old Havana through the efforts of the Office of the Historian of the city, which was directed by Eusebio Leal.

Old Havana and its fortifications were added to the UNESCO World Heritage List in 1982.

Royal Shipyard 

 
The Royal Arsenal was located southeast of the Campo de Marte, immediately outside the southernmost gate of the city in the area presently occupied by Havana Central railway station. The surface of the Royal Arsenal of Havana formed a kind of quadrilateral, which occupied approximately nine hectares. Of this great extension, about three hectares was vacant land, for the most part unhealthy, low-lying and marshy; another five hectares were dedicated fundamentally to deposits of materials, barracks, and warehouses; Of these, some two or three hectares were used for shipbuilding and ship repair activities, and it was where the main facilities were located: davits, cranes, parapets, docks, transport pits, the largest of which had almost a hundred fifty meters at the end of the 18th century; it also had a hospital of fateful fame for the high incidence of deaths due to yellow fever among patients who were admitted there for other causes. On the south side of the Arsenal, some five hundred meters of coastline formed a small inlet of almost a hectare in area, with low bottoms, which allowed the constructed ships to be launched smoothly.

La Alameda de Paula 

The Alameda de Paula is a promenade in Havana, Cuba, and was the first to be built in the city.

The Alameda de Paula was commissioned by Captain General Felipe de Fons de Viela, member of the court of King Carlos III. It was built by architect Antonio Fernández de Trebejos in 1777. The site of the old Rincón refuse dump, initially the promenade was a dirt track with some benches and flanked by two rows of poplar trees. It was given the name Alameda de Paula because of its proximity to the Hospital and Iglesia of San Francisco de Paula which had been built in 1664. An ornamented marble fountain was built in 1847. Between 1803 and 1805 the pavement was tiled, a fountain and stone benches, lampposts and the marble column were added, it qualified as a pleasant entertainment for the residents of the Villa de San Cristóbal, lacking recreational sites at that time. The Alameda de Paula became one of Havana's most important social and cultural spaces and the model of the Paseo del Prado designed in 1925 by Jean-Claude Nicolas Forestier.

The Alameda de Paula became one of Havana's most important social and cultural spaces, it was the model of the Paseo del Prado designed in 1925 by Jean-Claude Nicolas Forestier. It was given the name Alameda de Paula because of its proximity to the old Hospital and Iglesia of San Francisco de Paula. Between 1803 and 1805 the pavement was tiled, a fountain and stone benches, lampposts and the marble column were added, it qualified as a pleasant entertainment for the residents of the Villa de San Cristóbal, lacking recreational sites at that time.

The promenade was the subject of various transformations in the course of the 19th century; the embankment was tiled, a fountain was located there and the back of the seats was latticed. By that time it was considered the most popular and busiest place in the city. Toilets were built which increased its popularity. In the 1940s, squares were drawn at its ends, widened, and provided with access stairs and seats, street lamps were updated.

In 1841, the stairs that gave access to the promenade were widened and several lampposts were added. In the year 2000, the Havana promenade was restored and extended until it reached the Iglesia de San Francisco de Paula.

Paseo de Tacón 

The Paseo de Tacón, or Paseo Militar, was created by the Captain General Miguel Tacón y Rosique (1834–1838) who promoted the reform of the "road" that, starting from the calles of San Luis de Gonzaga (Reina) and Belascoáin, connected to the Castillo del Príncipe. Calle Belascoáin was the edge between the city and the countryside.

Avenida Carlos III, was a promenade that Captain General (Spanish: Capitanía General de Cuba) Miguel Tacón y Rosique, put into operation in 1836. When first created, it was called the Paseo de Tacón. Years later, the name was changed to Carlos III in honor of the King of Spain, a statue of the king was erected. Avenida de Carlos III begins at the intersection with the Ayestarán and Presidente Menocal or Calle Infanta.

The beautification plan of Havana by the engineer Mariano Carrillo de Albornoz during the third decade of the nineteenth century, contemplated the construction of s comfortable and beautiful walk that would serve for the recreation of the city's residents who were already spreading to more and more of its original city limits and as framed by the original wall that protected them from foreign attacks.

The Paseo de Tacón would allow for better communication with the Spanish troops in the Castillo del Príncipe, because until then it was difficult to reach that military installation by having to circumvent a low and muddy road that became practically impassable in times of rains.

Tacon said about this project:
“It lacked the capital of a country walk where you could breathe the pure and free air, and I resolved to undertake it from the field that they call from Peñalver to the hillside where the Prince's castle is located. It was this site, once swampy and watery, the most on purpose for a work of this kind in the surroundings of this city, in the part where it is not surrounded by the sea. There was also another reason that turned the work into doubly useful, which was the frank communication of this square with the castle, interrupted by that part in the rainy season.”

Well-known since the time of the monarchy by the name Carlos III, the street is more than 50 meters in width and serves to direct traffic to and from the oldest areas of Havana. It has four lanes of traffic it is the widest traffic artery in the city.

Quinta de los molinos 

The Quinta de Los Molinos is more than two centuries old and a national monument, an oasis in the heart of the city located at the intersection of one of Havana's heaviest traffic arteries: Infanta, Carlos III, and Boyeros avenues. The Quinta since Spanish times has had a complicated history to various events and characters, mainly with General Máximo Gómez.

The original area exceeded the territory it currently occupies as it extended north to approximately the location of the University of Havana, to the northwest to Hospital Calixto García, and west to G Street, including the Castillo del Principe, and south to Salvador Allende avenue and east to Infanta street.

It is in the general vicinity of the Paseo de Tacón (Avenida Carlos III), the University of Havana, and the Castillo del Principe.

The Quinta de Los Molinos was the location where the Captaincy General of Cuba maintained their summer residence in the 1850s – 1870s.

The location acquires the name Quinta de Los Molinos, due to the existence of two mills used to grind tobacco and obtain snuff. The mills were owned by Martín de Aróstegui, president of the Royal Tobacco Factory belonging to the Spanish king, hence its name. This name appeared in the National Archive of Cuba in 1850 and has been maintained to this day. Before 1850 it was known as the Tacón Garden, as it appears in a plan of 1843 and in a marble plaque, enclosed in the wall of an old building in the area.

These mills operated until the second half of the 19th century, moved by the force of the water from the so-called Zanja Real, the first aqueduct that Havana had. Its construction began in 1592, and they were finished after 27 years of work. Very close to the Cathedral of Havana is the Callejón del Chorro, whose name comes from its old use. Originally the cathedral was called Plaza de la Ciénaga, since it was there where the people of Havana came to stock up on water, brought by the Zanja Real.

At the end of the War of Independence in Cuba, with the defeat of Spain and in the absence of the representation of the Cuban people, the Treaty of Paris was signed on December 10. After the war was formally ended, the President of the Republic of Cuba in Arms, Bartolomé Masó, met the Assembly of Representatives of Santa Cruz del Sur and resigned from his position. The Assembly moved to Havana, to house number 819 on Calzada del Cerro.

The more than 11 km long El Chorro, as the Zanja Real was known, started at the Almendares River and brought water to Old Havana crossing Zanja Street (bearing its name). This first aqueduct ceased its use with the development of the city. Thus the Spanish government was forced to find an alternative solution for the supply of water to Old Havana, creating in 1835, the aqueduct of Fernando VII and the Albear in 1858 which were joined in 1878.

When the king's mills disappeared, the Botanical Garden of Havana was founded, along with the construction of the resthouse of the Captaincy General of Cuba. Starting in the 1820s, research and studies on plants were carried out by Felipe Poey Aloy. The Botanical Garden was transferred, from the area that currently includes the American Fraternity Park and the south of the National Capitol, where the first Botanical Garden had been founded in 1817.

The herbarium of the old Botanical Garden of Havana, in which it was started, sought the development of the botanical collection. Álvaro Reinoso carried out many of his experiments, having many small plots dedicated to the cultivation of sugar cane. The University of Havana took over between 1850 and 1871, during this time it passed into the hands of the Spanish government for a period of 8 years.

After this period, the Spanish government returned the land to the university establishing the School of Botany, which sharing its function with the School of Second Education.

In 1906 the garden was inscribed in the World System of Botanical Gardens. The butterfly Hedychium coronarium was declared in 1936 as the national flower of Cuba.

The villa's botanical garden was surrounded by wrought-iron railings. In addition to its plants, attributing it in 1906 a place in the International Association of Botanic Gardens, there are life-size statues and busts of Olympian gods such as Minerva, Juno, and Ceres.

In 1888 the Cuban Grand Master and World Chess Champion José Raúl Capablanca was born in the Castillo del Príncipe whose father was a Spanish army officer who lived there.

El Malecón 

The Malecón (officially Avenida de Maceo) is a broad esplanade, roadway, and seawall that stretches for 8km (5miles) along the coast in Havana, Cuba, from the mouth of Havana Harbor in Old Havana, along the north side of the Centro Habana neighborhood and the Vedado neighborhood, ending at the mouth of the Almendares River. New businesses are appearing on the esplanade due to economic reforms in Cuba that now allow Cubans to own private businesses.

Construction of the Malecón began in 1901, during temporary U.S. military rule. The main purpose of building the Malecón was to protect Havana from the sea.

To celebrate the construction of the first 500m section of the Malecón, the American government built a roundabout at the intersection of Paseo del Prado, which, according to architects of the period, was the first one built in Cuba with steel-reinforced concrete. In front of the roundabout, where every Sunday bands played Cuban melodies, the Miramar Hotel was built, which was very much in fashion for the first 15 years of independence, and which was the first one where the waiters wore tuxedos (dinner jackets) and vests (waistcoats) with gold buttons.

Subsequent Cuban governments continued the extension of the first section of the Malecón. In 1923, it reached the mouth of the Almendares River between K and L streets in Vedado, where the United States Embassy was built, near the José Martí Sports Park and, further out, the Hotel Rosita de Hornedo (today, the Sierra Maestra).

In 1957 and 1958, the roadway served as the venue of the Cuban Grand Prix.

 In 1901 and 1902, from the Paseo del Prado to Calle Crespo
 Between 1902 and 1921 as far as the Monument to the Victims of the USS Maine
 Between 1948 and 1952 to the mouth of the Almendares River

The Malecón continues to be popular among Cubans.

It is also a means of income for poorer families as individual fishermen cast their lures there. In addition, it is a hotspot for prostitution in Cuba by men and women.

Although the houses lining the Malecón are mostly in ruins, the Malecón remains one of the most spectacular and popular destinations in Havana.

There are a number of important monuments along the Malecón, including those to General Máximo Gomez, Antonio Maceo, General Calixto García, and the Monument to the Victims of the USS Maine.

At the intersection of 23rd Street, the Malecón marks the northeast end of the La Rampa section of 23rd Street, Vedado.

In the Plaza de la Dignidad is a statue of José Martí and in front of the Embassy of the United States, the José Martí Anti-Imperialist Platform.

Significant buildings include the Castillo de la Real Fuerza, the Castillo de San Salvador de la Punta, Malecón 17 (Las Cariátides) and the Hotel Nacional.

There were several buildings, monuments, and geographical features that were a part of Barrio de San Lázaro including the Torreón de San Lázaro, La Casa de Beneficencia, Hospital de San Lázaro, exthe Espada Cemetery, the Casa de Dementes de San Dionisio, the Quarry of San Lázaro, the Batería de la Reina, the Santa Clara Battery, and Hill of Taganana, among others.

The Malecón has served as an inspiration for several cocktail names, including the "Malecón cocktail" by John Escalante that can be traced back to his 1915 Cuban cocktail guide, Manual Del Cantinero (p,23).

Colón Cemetery 

El Cementerio de Cristóbal Colón, also called La Necrópolis de Cristóbal Colón, was founded in 1876 in the Vedado neighbourhood of Havana, Cuba to replace the Espada Cemetery in the Barrio de San Lázaro.

Named for Christopher Columbus, the cemetery is noted for its many elaborately sculpted memorials. It is estimated the cemetery has more than 500 major mausoleums. Before the Espada Cemetery and the Colón Cemetery were built, interments took place in crypts at the various churches throughout Havana, for example, at the Havana Cathedral or Church Crypts in Havana Vieja.
The Colón Cemetery is one of the most important cemeteries in the world and is generally held to be one of the most important in Latin America in historical and architectural terms, second only to La Recoleta in Buenos Aires. Prior to the opening of the Colón Cemetery, Havana's dead were laid to rest in the crypts of local churches and then, beginning in 1806, at Havana's newly opened Espada Cemetery located in the Barrio de San Lazaro and near the cove of Juan Guillen close to the San Lázaro Leper Hospital and the Casa de Beneficencia. When locals realized there would be a need for a larger space for their community for the deceased (due to a cholera outbreak in 1868), planning began for the Colón Cemetery.

The Colón is a Catholic cemetery and has elaborate monuments, tombs and statues by 19th and 20th century artists. Plots were assigned according to social class, and soon became a means for patrician families to display their wealth and power with ever more elaborate tombs and mausoleums. The north main entrance is marked by a gateway decorated with biblical reliefs and topped by a marble sculpture by José Vilalta Saavedra: Faith, Hope and Charity. Some of the most important and elaborate tombs lie between the main gate and the Capilla Central. The Monumento a los Bomberos (Firemen's Monument) built by Spanish sculptor Agustín Querol and architect Julio M Zapata, commemorates the twenty eight firemen who died when a hardware shop in La Habana Vieja caught fire in 1890.

In front of the main entrance, at the axes of the principal avenues Avenida Cristóbal Colón, Obispo Espada, and Obispo Fray Jacinto, stands the Central Chapel modelled on Il Duomo in Florence is the octagonal Capilla Central (central chapel), the Capilla del Amor (Chapel of Love), built by Juan Pedro Baró for his wife Catalina Laza. On every side rectangular streets lead geometrically to the cemetery's 50,000hectares. The area of the cemetery is defined by rank and social status of the dead with distinct areas: priests, soldiers, brotherhoods, the wealthy, the poor, infants, victims of epidemics, pagans and the condemned. The best preserved and grandest tombs stand on or near the central avenues and their axes.

With more than 800,000 graves and 1million interments, space in the Colón Cemetery is currently at a premium and as such after three years remains are removed from their tombs, boxed and placed in a storage building.

Yet, for all its elegance and grandeur, the Colón Cemetery conceals as much as it displays. Empty tombs and desecrated family chapels disfigure the stately march of family memorials even in the most prominent of the avenues, and away from the central cross-streets are in ruin. Many of these are the tombs of exiled families, whose problems with caring for their dead have been complicated by residency outside of Cuba since the Revolution of 1959.

The Cementerio Colón measures 620 by 800meters (122.5acres). Designed by the Galician architect Calixto Arellano de Loira y Cardoso, a graduate of Madrid's Royal Academy of Arts of San Fernando, who became the Colón's first resident when he died and before his work was completed. It was built between 1871 and 1886, on former farmland. Laid out in a grid similar to El Vedado by numbered and lettered streets it becomes an urban microcosm of the city. The cemetery contains works by some of the most distinguished Cuban artists of the 19th and 20th centuries, such as Miguel Melero, José Vilalta de Saavedra, Rene Portocarrero, Rita longa, Eugenio Batista, Max Sorges Recio, Juan José Sicre, and others.

The design follows the custom of laying out the plan with five crosses formed by perpendicularly intersecting streets. The two main avenues give rise to the central cross, each of the four resulting spaces, called barracks, is subdivided in turn by two other streets that intersect at right angles. Five squares are formed at the intersections, the main one of which is the Central Chapel, with an octagonal floor plan and surrounded by portals, a Loire project completed with modifications by Francisco Marcotegui.

The cemetery is laid out roughly on a north–south axis, parallel to the last stretch of the Almendares River, and against the street grid of Vedado. It is on the north axis, thus its main streets are on the four cardinal points of the compass. Symbolized by a Greek cross, it represents the four directions of the earth and the spread of the gospel to all directions as well as the four platonic elements. We find Greek crosses against a yellow background along the perimeter fence enclosing the cemetery, as well as part of the design diagram of the cemetery, which employs several Greek crosses at different scales thus forming an architectural tapestry. The main avenues, Avenida Cristóbal Colón, Obispo Espada, and Obispo Fray Jacinto, at six hundred by eight hundred meters, is the first cross at the scale of the city (red cross-areal photo).

Calixto Arellano de Loira y Cardoso was also the designer of the main portal, of Romanesque inspiration. It is 21.66 meters high, 34.40 in length, and 2.50 in thickness, executed with variations by Eugenio Rayneri Sorrentino  for and eventually crowned, by José Vilalta Saavedra, by the sculptural group Fe. Esperanza y Caridad (Faith, Hope and Charity). The first stone for its construction was placed on October 30, 1871, since 1868 burials have been carried out.

Paseo del Prado 

Construction of the first European-style boulevard in Havana, the first street of its type outside the city walls, was proposed by Don Felipe Fons de Viela y Ondeano in 1770, and work was completed in the mid-1830s during the term of Captain General Miguel Tacón y Rosique (1834–1838) who was also responsible for the Paseo de Tacón, the Plaza del Vapor and the Tacón Theatre.

in 1925 French landscape architect Jean-Claude Nicolas Forestier redesigned the Paseo del Prado, lined it with trees, bronze sculptures of lions, coral stone walls and marble benches. The bronze lions were added in 1928. The Lions were commissioned by President Gerardo Machado. They were authored by French sculptor Jean Puiforcat and Cuban-born master caster Juan Comas Masique, who used the metal from decommissioned cannons to forge the lions.

Lining the boulevard are important buildings such as the Gran Teatro de La Habana, hotels (including the Hotel Sevilla), cinemas such as the Fausto, theaters, and mansions imitating styles from Madrid, París and Vienna. El Prado was the first paved street in Havana. When El Capitolio was built in 1929 that section of the promenade was removed.
At the corner of Cárcel street the car dealership Packard & Cunnigham was located, and in 1940 the radio network RHC-Cadena Azul established its studios on the Prado.

Jean-Claude Nicolas Forestier (January 9, 1861, in Aix-les-Bains – October 26, 1930, in Paris) was a French landscape architect, who trained with Adolphe Alphand and became conservator of the promenades of Paris. Forestier was the landscape architect of El Prado and had moved to Havana from France for five years to collaborate with architects and landscape architects on various projects throughout the city including the design of the gardens for the Capitolio. He worked on the master plan of the city with the aim to create a harmonic balance between classical forms and the tropical landscape of Havana. He embraced and connected the city's road network while accentuating prominent landmarks through a series of parks, avenues, "paseos," and boulevards which 50 years later proved to be a direct contrast to the Havana Plan Piloto of Josep Lluis Sert which was influenced by CIAM planning principles. The Congrès internationaux d'architecture moderne (CIAM), was an organization founded in 1928 and disbanded in 1959, responsible for a series of events and congresses arranged across Europe by the most prominent architects of the time, with the objective of spreading the principles of the Modern Movement focusing in all the main domains of architecture, landscape architecture, urbanism, industrial design, and many other design practices. Nicolas Forestier's influence has left his mark on Havana; many of his ideas were cut short by the Great Depression of 1929.
The Paseo del Prado had been a replacement for the first promenade in the City of La Alameda de Paula which was built around 1776 by Antonio Fernández Trevejo. By the 1950s, families were moving from the Prado to Miramar and other parts of the city such as the Vedado and Siboney. After the 1959 revolution, the Prado streets and many of its buildings were, like the majority of buildings in Havana, physically deteriorated to the point that many collapsed and remain to this day in a ruined state.

Barrio Chino 

Barrio Chino was once Latin America's largest and most vibrant Chinese community, incorporated into the city by the early part of the 20th century. Hundreds of thousands of Chinese workers were brought in by Spanish settlers from Guangdong, Fujian, Hong Kong, and Macau via Manila, Philippines starting in the mid-19th century to replace or work alongside African slaves. After completing 8-year contracts, many Chinese immigrants settled permanently in Havana.

The first 206 Chinese-born arrived in Havana on June 3, 1847. The neighborhood was booming with Chinese restaurants, laundries, banks, pharmacies, theaters and several Chinese-language newspapers, the neighborhood comprised 44square blocks during its prime. The heart of Barrio Chino is on el Cuchillo de Zanja (or The Zanja Canal). The strip is a pedestrian-only street adorned with many red lanterns, dancing red paper dragons and other Chinese cultural designs, there is a great number of restaurants that served a full spectrum of Chinese dishes.

The district has two paifang (Chinese arches), the larger one located on Calle Dragones. China donated the materials in the late 1990s. It has a well defined written welcoming sign in Chinese and Spanish. The smaller arch is located on Calle Zanja. The Cuban's Chinese boom ended when Fidel Castro's 1959 revolution seized private businesses, sending tens of thousands of business-minded Chinese fleeing, mainly to the United States. Descendants are now making efforts to preserve and revive the culture.

Culture

Visual arts 

The Museo Nacional de Bellas Artes de La Habana is a Fine Arts museum that exhibits Cuban and international art. The museum houses one of the largest collections of paintings and sculpture from Latin America and is the largest in the Caribbean region. Under the Cuban Ministry of Culture, it occupies two locations in the vicinity of Havana's Paseo del Prado, these are the Palace of Fine Arts, devoted to Cuban art and the Palace of the Asturian Center, dedicated to universal art. Its artistic heritage is made up of over 45,000 pieces. Since 1995 the capital hosts the headquarters of the Ludwig Foundation of Cuba in Vedado, founded by the German collectors Peter and Irene Ludwig, it is a non-governmental and non-profit organization for the dissemination and protection of Cuban art.

Federico Beltrán Masses 

Federico Beltrán Masses (September 8, 1885 – October 4, 1949) was a Spanish painter born in Cuba; the only child of Luis Beltrán Fernández Estepona, a former Spanish army officer stationed in Cuba, and Dona Mercedes Masses Olives, the daughter of a doctor from Lleida, Catalonia, who himself had married the daughter of a wealthy Spanish Cuban-landowner. He spent his youth in Barcelona, where he began his artistic training in the well-regarded Escola de la Llotja. He later moved to Madrid, where he received more training under Joaquín Sorolla. He married Irene Narezo Dragoné, a painter as well, of a distinguished family and good economic position. They moved to Paris in 1916 to further Masses' career and settled there until 1946, after which he moved to Barcelona in 1946 and later died in 1949.
Beltran Masses was renowned as a master of colour and the psychological portrait, as well as a painter of seductive images of women. Born in Cuba, where his mother's family had lived for nearly two centuries, his family returned to Spain to live in Barcelona, when he was seven years old – the painter's Spanish heritage would influence his oeuvre deeply while he sometimes referenced the tropical exoticism of Cuba in the settings for some of his subjects. His paintings are rich with musical and poetic references influenced by ‘Greek mythology, orphic mysteries and fantasies of Asia, where we are led by Gustave Moreau’ remarked Louis Vauxcelles.

Connection to the world of music and dance 
A guitar featured recurrently in many of his subject paintings, while his interest in contemporary dance led to his design of the scenery and gypsy costume for a 1929 performance by then celebrated dancer Antonia Mercé "La Argentina" (whose portrait he painted).

An early fascination with Symbolism and ‘the Ancients’ manifest in paintings such as Lackmy and Canción de Bilitis, while his dark paintings of eroticised women, languorously posed in fantastical nocturnal settings set him apart from contemporary artistic trends. His 1915 portrait of a Spanish countess, naked but for a white mantilla, seated between two fully clothed companions (La Maja Marquesa), was publicly denounced and had to be retitled. This inspired Beltrán's move to Paris, where he spent most of the next thirty years. Before his departure a solo exhibition of his work in Madrid in 1916 received the accolade of a visit from the Spanish King, Alfonso XIII; this was followed by further successes at the XII Venice Biennale of 1920, where an entire pavilion was dedicated to his work, and several large-scale exhibitions in Paris, New York, Palm Beach and London received enthusiastic reviews.

Such was his fame that in 1926 Martha Graham titled a dance at her first public performance in New York Portrait – Beltran Masses; in 1929 the temporary removal from a London exhibition of two particularly explicit paintings led to denunciations of censorship but insured an attendance of over 17,000 paying visitors in just three weeks. Beltran Masses' portrait subjects included kings and princes, Hollywood stars, and leaders of high society on both sides of the Atlantic, while he was particularly sought out by women who had unashamedly rejected convention and whose lives had sometimes scandalised the public.

Spanish royal support and his move to Paris 
His 1915 portrait of a Spanish countess, naked but for a white mantilla, seated between two fully clothed companions (La Maja Marquesa), was refused by the Comité of the Exposición Nacional de Bellas Artes (the Spanish equivalent of the jury of the Paris salon). This decided Beltran Masses’ move to Paris, where he spent most of the next thirty years.

Before his departure a solo exhibition of his work in Madrid in 1916 received the accolade of a visit from the Spanish King; Alfonso XIII's support and a personal introduction by the Spanish Dowager Queen, Maria Christina of Austria to the Spanish Ambassador, gave Beltrán immediate access to Parisian society. He leased a splendid residence near the Porte de Passy in the 16th arrondissement of Paris, where he established his studio. Here, the coarse Catalan peasants of his youthful canvases gave way to dark eyed gitanas and recumbent majas, wearing costumes that emphasised their feminine and seductive qualities. His paintings of women earned him comparisons with the poetry of Baudelaire and, indeed, he later provided the images for an illustrated edition of Les Fleurs du Mal. The contemporary viewer was struck by his use of colour and the mysterious, nocturnal world in which he set so many of his subjects, while sharply illuminating principal figures. He often painted in a darkened room, using artificial light to emphasize the contrast between bodies and their setting. He places figures against rich fabrics or, following his sojourn in Venice in 1920, in imaginary Venetian settings.

His work as a portraitist became an important source of revenue; European royalty, members of the Spanish, French, Italian and British aristocracy, the wives and lovers of newly rich entrepreneurs and leading actors and dancers all vied for his attention. Despite the artistic revolution led by Beltran Masses’ Spanish contemporaries Pablo Picasso and Juan Gris, Beltrán never embraced abstract cubism and futurism held no appeal for him. The realist legacy of his teacher Joaquín Sorolla (1863–1923), was subsumed instead by a mystical symbolism distinctly Beltrán-Masses's. In his use of colour and at times exaggerated drawing, Beltrán forged an individual and radical identity which concentrated on the psychological. His work bears superficial comparison with that of his friend Kees van Dongen, who, like Beltrán, captured the escapism that characterised post-First World War society.

Víctor Manuel García Valdés 

Víctor Manuel García Valdés (October 31, 1897 – February 1, 1969) was a Cuban painter. He was an early member of the "Vanguardia" movement of artists who, beginning in the 1920s, combined European concepts of Modern art with native Primitivism to create a distinctly Cuban aesthetic.

Born in Havana, at age six Victor Manuel already showed a precocious aptitude for drawing. At age 12 he enrolled in the Escuela Nacional de Bellas Artes "San Alejandro", the most prominent art school in Cuba, where he studied under the famous painter Leopoldo Romañach. By his mid-teens he was acting as an unofficial professor of elementary drawing.

By age 19 Manuel's talent started becoming evident. Nevertheless, he didn't have his first personal exhibition until 1924, at the Gallery of San Rafael in Havana, when he was 26 years old. In 1925 he traveled to France for a year of study in Paris. There, he was exposed to the various Modernist trends of the city's bustling art scene; he found particular resonance in Paul Gauguin's Primitivist style of painting.<ref name = CA&NI>Martinez, Juan A.;Cuban Art & National Identity: The Vanguardia Painters, 1927–1950; University Press of Florida, 1994; </ref> It was in Montparnasse that a group of French artists advised him to sign his paintings only as "Víctor Manuel" (until then, he had used his entire name and surname).

After returning to Cuba, Manuel's work was featured in both a solo show (Feb. 1927) and in the Exhibition of New Work group show (May 1927) at the Painters and Sculptors Association of Havana. Sponsored by Revista de Avance, a magazine which was the main voice of the Vanguardia artists, these shows are considered to be important starting points of the Cuban modern painting era.Artnet.com – Victor Manuel biography; http://www.artnet.com/artists/victor-manuel/biography retvd 12 9 15 In 1929, following another period of study and travel in Europe, Manuel created his most famous painting, La Gitana Tropical (The Tropical Gipsy), popularly known as "La Gioconda Americana" ("The American Mona Lisa"), which is in the Museo Nacional de Bellas Artes in Havana. It is considered by critics to be one of the defining pieces of Cuban Avant-garde art.

In 1935, Víctor Manuel began to reap awards for his work, receiving prizes in the first two exhibitions of painting and sculpture, held in 1935 and 1938 respectively, at Havana's Lyceum. He was given solo exhibitions at the University of Havana (1945), the Association of Reporters (1951), and the Lex Gallery (1959), and was the subject of a career retrospective at the national galleries in 1959. In 1964, he began a new stage in which he expressed himself through lithography, holding experimental graphic workshops in Havana's Plaza de la Catedral. He also continued exhibiting his works abroad.

He died in 1969, in Havana.

 Wifredo Lam 

Wifredo Óscar de la Concepción Lam y Castilla (December 8, 1902 – September 11, 1982), better known as Wifredo Lam, was a Cuban artist who sought to portray and revive the enduring Afro-Cuban spirit and culture. Inspired by and in contact with some of the most renowned artists of the 20th century, including Pablo Picasso, Henri Matisse, Frida Kahlo and Diego Rivera, Lam melded his influences and created a unique style, which was ultimately characterized by the prominence of hybrid figures. This distinctive visual style of his also influences many artists. Though he was predominantly a painter, he also worked with sculpture, ceramics and printmaking in his later life.

Lam, like many of the most renowned artists of the 20th century, combined radical modern styles with the "primitive" arts of the Americas. While Diego Rivera and Joaquín Torres García drew inspiration from Pre-Columbian art, Lam was influenced by the Afro-Cubans of that time. He dramatically synthesized the Surrealist and Cubist strategies while incorporating the iconography and spirit of Afro-Cuban religion. For that reason, his work does not belong to any particular art movement.

He held the belief that society focused too much on the individual and sought to show humanity as a whole in his artwork. He painted generic figures, creating the universal. To further his goal, he often painted mask-like faces. While Cuban culture and mythology permeated his work, it dealt with the nature of man and therefore was wholly relatable to non-Cubans.

Opened in 1983, the Wifredo Lam Center for Contemporary Art (in Spanish: Centro de Arte Contemporáneo Wifredo Lam) is a state-run gallery in tribute to Lam and located in Havana, Cuba. This art gallery is responsible for the organization of the Bienal de la Habana, Cuba, a permanent art collection of approx. 1000 works, and research and study of contemporary visual arts in developing countries.

In 2015 a retrospective exhibition of his works opened at the Centre Georges Pompidou in Paris, set to travel to the Reina Sofia Museum in Spain and the Tate Museum in London afterward.

Lam, like many of the most renowned artists of the 20th century, combined radical modern styles with the "primitive" arts of the Americas. While Diego Rivera and Joaquín Torres García drew inspiration from Pre-Columbian art, Lam was influenced by the Afro-Cubans of that time. He dramatically synthesized the Surrealist and Cubist strategies while incorporating the iconography and spirit of Afro-Cuban religion. For that reason, his work does not belong to any particular art movement.

He held the belief that society focused too much on the individual and sought to show humanity as a whole in his artwork. He painted generic figures, creating the universal. To further his goal, he often painted mask-like faces. While Cuban culture and mythology permeated his work, it dealt with the nature of man and therefore was wholly relatable to non-Cubans.

Opened in 1983, the Wifredo Lam Center for Contemporary Art (in Spanish: Centro de Arte Contemporáneo Wifredo Lam) is a state-run gallery in tribute to Lam and located in Havana, Cuba. This art gallery is responsible for the organization of the Bienal de la Habana, Cuba, a permanent art collection of approx. 1000 works, and research and study of contemporary visual arts in developing countries.

In 2015 a retrospective exhibition of his works opened at the Centre Georges Pompidou in Paris, set to travel to the Reina Sofia Museum in Spain and the Tate Museum in London afterwards.

 Performing arts 

Facing Havana's Central Park is the baroque Great Theatre of Havana, a prominent theater built in 1837. It is now home of the National Ballet of Cuba and the International Ballet Festival of Havana, one of the oldest in the New World. The façade of the building is adorned with a stone and marble statue. There are also sculptural pieces by Giuseppe Moretti, representing allegories depicting benevolence, education, music and theater. The principal theater is the García Lorca Auditorium, with seats for 1,500 and balconies. Glories of its rich history; the Italian tenor Enrico Caruso sang, the Russian ballerina Anna Pavlova danced, and the French Sarah Bernhardt acted.

 Alicia Alonso 

Alicia Alonso (born Alicia Ernestina de la Caridad del Cobre Martínez del Hoyo; December 21, 1920 – October 17, 2019) was a Cuban prima ballerina assoluta and choreographer whose company became the Ballet Nacional de Cuba in 1955. She is best known for her portrayals of Giselle and the ballet version of Carmen.
From the age of nineteen, Alonso was afflicted with an eye condition and became partially blind. Her partners always had to be in the exact place she expected them to be, and she used lights in different parts of the stage to guide herself.

Alonso was born "on the outskirts" of Havana in 1920, the fourth child of Antonio Martínez Arredondo, lieutenant veterinarian of the army, and Ernestina del Hoyo y Lugo, a dressmaker. Alonso began dancing as a child. In June 1931 she began studying ballet at Sociedad Pro-Arte Musical in Havana with Nikolai Yavorsky.

 Radio and television 
 CMQ 

CMQ was a Cuban radio and television station located in Havana, Cuba, reaching an audience in the 1940s and 1950s, attracting viewers and listeners with a program that ranged from music and news dissemination. It later expanded into radio and television networks. As a radio network it was a heated competitor of the RHC-Cadena Azul network.
The company was founded on March 12, 1933, by Miguel Gabriel and Ángel Cambó. Ten years later, on August 1, 1943, half of it was acquired by the business group of Goar Mestre. In the beginning, it transmitted only in the capital expanding later to the rest of the country.

Pre-revolutionary Cuba was an early adopter of new technology, including TV. Cuba was the first Latin American country to have television. In December 1946 station CM-21P conducted an experimental multi-point live broadcast.

Regular commercial broadcasting began in October 1950 with Gaspar Pumarejo's Unión Radio TV. This was followed by Goar Mestre Espinosa's CMQ-TV on channel 6 on December 18, 1950. CMQ officially launched on March 11, 1951, and would become an NBC affiliate. By 1954, CMQ-TV had expanded into a seven station network. With the CMQ network, Cuba the second country in the world, only after the United States, to have a national TV network.

At the beginning of the 1950s with the transmission of the novel El Derecho de Nacer, by Felix B. Caignet, displaced the competing station, RHC Cadena Azul. It is with this leadership that the second Cuban television channel, CMQ TV, Channel 6 is born. It was initially located on Calle Monte, on the corner of Paseo del Prado. On March 12, 1948, the radio studio was moved to the Radiocentro building in La Rampa and Calle L in El Vedado.

 La Tremenda Corte 

La Tremenda Corte was a radio comedy show produced from the Radiocentro CMQ Building in Havana, Cuba. The scripts were written by Cástor Vispo, a Spaniard who became Cuban citizen. The show was aired nonstop from 1942 to 1961. Later, the format of the show was adapted for a TV sitcom in Monterrey, Mexico, however, only three and a half seasons were produced from 1966 to 1969.

Cástor Vispo was born in A Coruña, Spain. He left his hometown at the age of 18, shortly after the Spanish Civil War broke out, to join his family in Cuba. While working at the El Universal newspaper, Vispo used his free time to write. His stories were closely related to the Cuban culture of the period, encompassing written press, theater, and Cuban radio.

 Popularity 
“La Tremenda Corte", was the work of this clever and prolific comedy writer Castor Vispo definitely fused with speech and Cuban folk psychology.

Both Vispo as the production team were given the task of finding local comedians who would shed a humorous light, in 1941 (during WWII) and help people to forget the hardships of that time. Soon they found Leopoldo Fernández (Tres Patines), a talented comedian who was already recognized in radio spots and theatre, and his inseparable friend, Anibal de Mar.  The duo had already achieved popularity as the comedy duo Pototo y Filomeno, and they would bring parts of their act into the new show. The rest of the cast came from tests with other less well-known comedians, but equally outstanding.

The program began broadcasting on radio station RHC-Cadena Azul on January 7, 1942. It was owned by Amado Trinidad Velasco since 1941 (RHC belonged to the famous cigarette company Trinidad and Brothers).

In 1947, "La Tremenda Corte" like several other programs of its time, was transferred to rival station CMQ Radio advertisers and sponsors, seeking greater competitive advantage.
The programs were broadcast live back then, three times per week from Monday to Friday at 8:30 pm, and were sponsored by a firm of perfumery and soaps.

 CMQ Radio La Tremenda Corte aired uninterrupted from 1942 to 1961 (first RHC Cadena Azul and later at QMC), and its sole writer was Vispo. Despite such strenuous work for his imagination, Vispo always managed to pull through during this period. Over 360 shows are estimated to have been recorded, many of which are still heard on radio, but a few such episodes have never left Cuba and little is therefore known about them.
Of all these missing radio shows were recorded at station CMQ in Havana, between 1947 and 1961, no one knows how many still survive, and they are considered rare and invaluable for fans and collectors of the series.

In the peak of their success, the performances of the cast were taken to countries such as Puerto Rico, Venezuela, Colombia, Peru, Panama and the Dominican Republic, where they were acclaimed.

 TV series 
In 1955 the program received a second wind, becoming the TV space comedy "The show of Pototo & Filomeno" CMQ through TV, where Leopoldo Fernandez ("Pototo") made a very similar to "Tres Patines" with again his teammate Anibal de Mar (Filomeno).

The space consisted of skits and songs with orchestral music, a forerunner of its kind on the island of Cuba.  Its success prompted the couple's two music recordings and a second film ("Olé Cuba!") In 1957. The show was introduced in the Sierra and the Montmartre cabarets in Havana.

All this occurred parallel to his work with "La Tremenda Corte", but much of the public still identified with their radio characterizations.

 Radio show cancelled 
Beginning in 1960, production changed drastically as a result of the Cuban Revolution headed by Fidel Castro. The show had been adapted previously to play in local theatres to some controversy since the actors (Leopoldo Fernández especially) were vocal political critics both off and on stage. Castro's regime, with its rigid Marxist tendency in those years, showed its displeasure with the existence of comedy shows on the broadcast media, especially when political leaders started to become the butt of jokes.

1960 and 1961 were particularly difficult for the cast, as the government began sending sympathizers to chant Communist slogans and disrupt the performances.

Then, in 1961, the Cuban government placed all theater, radio and TV troupes under the purview of the state Censorship Commission.

Fernández was arrested over a shooting in performance and had to serve a 27-day house arrest sentence for which no further explanation was offered.

 Festivals 

 Film Festival 

The Havana Film Festival is a Cuban festival that focuses on the promotion of Latin American filmmakers. It is also known in Spanish as Festival Internacional del Nuevo Cine Latinoamericano de La Habana, and in English as International Festival of New Latin American Cinema of Havana. It takes place every year during December in the city of Havana, Cuba.

The inaugural International Festival of New Latin American Cinema was held on December 3, 1979, and more than 600 film directors of Latin America responded to the first call made by the Cuban Institute of the Cinematographic Art and Industry (ICAIC). Its founders the included President of ICAIC, Alfredo Guevara, and the filmmakers Julio García Espinosa and Pastor Vega.

As expressed in its founding convocation, the festival aimed to "promote the regular meeting of Latin American filmmakers who with their work enrich the artistic culture of our countries (…); ensure the joint presentation of fiction films, documentaries, cartoons and current events (…), and contribute to the international diffusion and circulation of the main and most significant productions of our cinematographies".

In 2013 the Havana Film Festival announced that it was reappointing Iván Giroud as its president. Giroud had previously served as president from 1994 to 2010.

 Health 

All Cuban residents have free access to health care in hospitals, local polyclinics, and neighborhood family doctors who serve on average 170 families each, which is one of the highest doctor-to-patient ratio in the world. However, the health system has suffered from shortages of supplies, equipment and medications caused by ending of the Soviet Union subsidies in the early 1990s and the US embargo. Nevertheless, Havana's infant mortality rate in 2009 was 4.9 per 1,000 live births, 5.12 in the country as a whole, which is lower than many developed nations, and the lowest in the developing world. Administration of the health care system for the nation is centered largely in Havana. Hospitals in Havana are run by the national government, and citizens are assigned hospitals and clinics to which they may go for attention.

 Sports 
Many Cubans are avid sports fans who particularly favor baseball. Havana's team in the Cuban National Series is Industriales. FCBA. The city has several large sports stadiums, the largest one is the Estadio Latinoamericano. Admission to sporting events is generally free, and impromptu games are played in neighborhoods throughout the city. Social clubs at the beaches provide facilities for water sports and include restaurants and dance halls.
 Havana was host to the 11th Pan American Games in 1991. Stadiums and facilities for this were built in the relatively unpopulated eastern suburbs.
 Havana was host to the 1992 IAAF World Cup in Athletics.
 Havana was an applicant to host the 2008 Summer Olympics and 2012 Summer Olympics, but was not shortlisted.
 Havana hosted the Centrobasket on three occasions, namely in 1969, 1989 and 1999.

 Notable people 

Notable Habaneros:

 See also 

 List of buildings in Havana
 History of Havana
Old Havana
 List of cities in the Caribbean
 Havana Plan Piloto

 Notes 

 References 

 Bibliography 

 Eddie Lennon, Julie Napier and Farida Haqiqi. Wonderful Havana (1st ed.). Cool World Books, updated February 2013.
 King, Charles Spencer (2009) Havana My Kind of Town. US: CreateSpace. .
 Alicia García Santana. Havana: History and Architecture of a Romantic City. Monacelli, October 2000. .
 Angela, Ferriol Maruaga; et al.: Cuba crisis, ajuste y situación social (1990–1996), Editorial de Ciencias Sociales, 1998. .
 The Rough Guide to Cuba (3rd ed.). Rough Guides, May 2005. .
 Barclay, Juliet (1993). Havana: Portrait of a City. London: Cassell.  (2003 paperback edition). A comprehensive account of the history of Havana from the early 16th century to the end of the 19th century.
 Carpentier, Alejo. La ciudad de las columnas (The city of columns). A historical review of the city from one of the major authors in the iberoamerican literature, a native of this city.
 Cluster, Dick, & Rafael Hernández, History of Havana. New York: Palgrave-MacMillan, 2006. . A social history of the city from 1519 to the present, co-authored by a Cuban writer and editor resident in Havana and an American novelist and writer of popular history.
 Eguren, Gustavo. La fidelísima Habana (The very faithful Havana). A fundamental illustrated book for those who wants to know the history of La Habana, includes chronicles, articles from natives and non-natives, archives documents, and more.
 United Railways of Havana. Cuba: A Winter Paradise. 1908–1909, 1912–1913, 1914–1915 and 1915–1916 editions. New York, 1908, 1912, 1914 and 1915. Maps, photos and descriptions of suburban and interurban electric lines.
 "Electric Traction in Cuba". Tramway & Railway World (London), April 1, 1909, pp. 243–44. Map, photos and description of Havana Central Railroad.
 "The Havana Central Railroad". Electrical World (New York), April 15, 1909, pp. 911–12. Text, 4 photos.
 "Three-Car Storage Battery Train". Electric Railway Journal (New York), September 28, 1912, p. 501. Photo and description of Cuban battery cars.
 Berta Alfonso Gallol. Los Transportes Habaneros. Estudios Históricos. La Habana, 1991. The definitive survey (but no pictures or maps).
 James A. Michener and John Kings. Six Days in Havana. University of Texas Press; first edition (1989). . Interviews with close to 200 Cubans of widely assorted backgrounds and positions, and concerns how the country has progressed after 90 years of independence from Spain and under the 30-year leadership of Castro.
 One more interesting note about that edition of The New York Times: On page 5, there is a short blurb mentioning, "The plan for holding a Pan-American exhibition at Buffalo has been shelved for the present owing to the unsettled condition of the public mind consequent upon the Spanish-Cuban complications." President William McKinley was assassinated at the Pan-American Exhibition when it was finally held in 1901.
 Cathryn Griffith, Havana Revisited: An Architectural Heritage. W. W. Norton 2010. 
 Guadalupe Garcia, Beyond the Walled City: Colonial Exclusion in Havana. 2015, Berkeley: University of California Press.  (review).

 External links 

 
 Martín Domínguez Esteban
 La sombra del arquitecto Martín Domínguez Esteban
 Exploring Havana: The tallest building in Cuba, El Focsa.
 FOCSA 
 Alicia Alonso entry, Concise Encyclopædia Britannica; accessed May 5, 2014.
 Profile, ABT Original Carmen premiere, abt.org; accessed May 5, 2014.
 ABT Original Theme and Variations, abt.org; accessed May 5, 2014.
 Video: Archive footage, Alonso and Erik Bruhn performing "Pas de Deux" from Giselle'', Act II (1955) at Jacob's Pillow
 Video: Witness: The First Lady of Cuban Ballet, interview broadcast on October 28, 2015, from BBC World Service

 
Capitals by country
Capitals in North America
Capitals in the Caribbean
Port cities in Cuba
Provinces of Cuba
World Heritage Sites in Cuba
Populated places established in 1515
1510s establishments in Cuba
1515 establishments in the Spanish West Indies
1515 establishments in North America